= Culture of Indonesia =

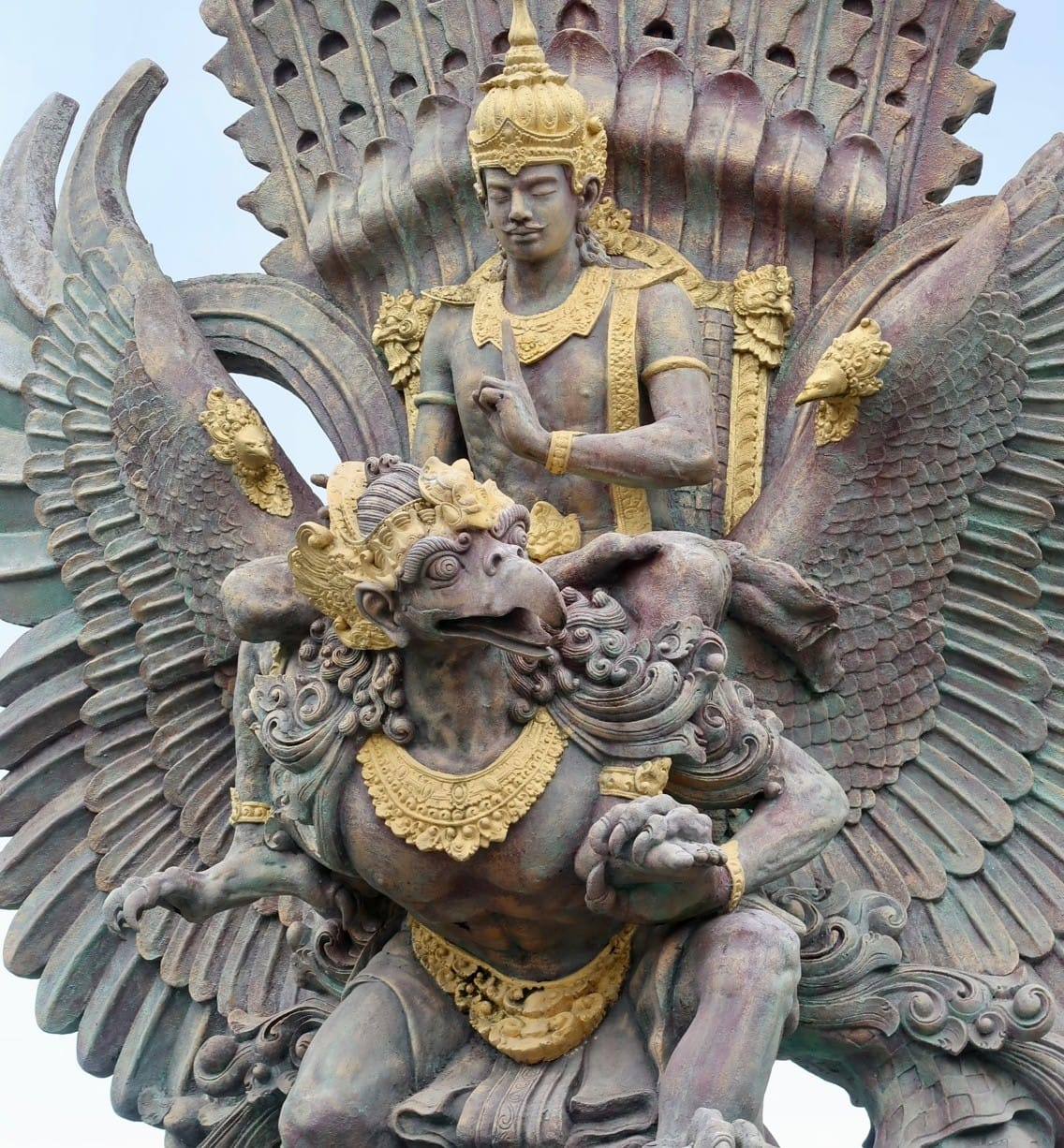
The Garuda Wisnu Kencana statue depicts Garuda, the national symbol of Indonesia, symbolizing unity and cultural heritage.

The culture of Indonesia (Indonesian: Budaya Indonesia) has been shaped by the interplay of indigenous customs and diverse foreign influences. As the world's largest archipelagic country, it is home to over 600 ethnic groups, including Austronesian and Melanesian cultures, contributing to its rich traditions, languages, and customs. Indonesia is a melting pot of diversity. Positioned along ancient trade routes between the Far East, South Asia, and the Middle East, the country has absorbed cultural practices influenced by Hinduism, Buddhism, Confucianism, Islam, and Christianity. These influences have created a complex cultural tapestry that often differs from the original indigenous cultures.

Examples of the fusion of Islam with Hinduism include Javanese Abangan belief. Balinese dances have stories about ancient Buddhist and Hindu kingdoms, while Islamic art forms and architecture are present in Sumatra, especially in the Minangkabau and Aceh regions. Traditional art, music and sport are combined in a martial art form called Pencak Silat.

The Western world has influenced Indonesia in science, technology and modern entertainment such as television shows, film and music, as well as political system and issues. India has notably influenced Indonesian songs and movies. A popular type of song is the Indian-rhythmical dangdut, which is often mixed with Arabic, Javanese and Malay folk music.

Despite the influences of foreign culture, some remote Indonesian regions still preserve uniquely indigenous culture. Indigenous ethnic groups Batak, Nias, Mentawai, Asmat, Dani, Sumba, Dayak, Toraja and many others are still practising their ethnic rituals, customs and wearing traditional clothes.

Indonesia currently holds sixteen items of UNESCO's Intangible Cultural Heritage, including wayang puppet theatre, kris, batik, education and training in Indonesian batik, angklung, saman dance, noken, three genres of traditional Balinese dance, pinisi ship, pencak silat, gamelan, jamu, and reog. Additionally, pantun, kebaya, and kolintang were inscribed through joint nominations.

== Traditional performing arts ==
=== Music ===
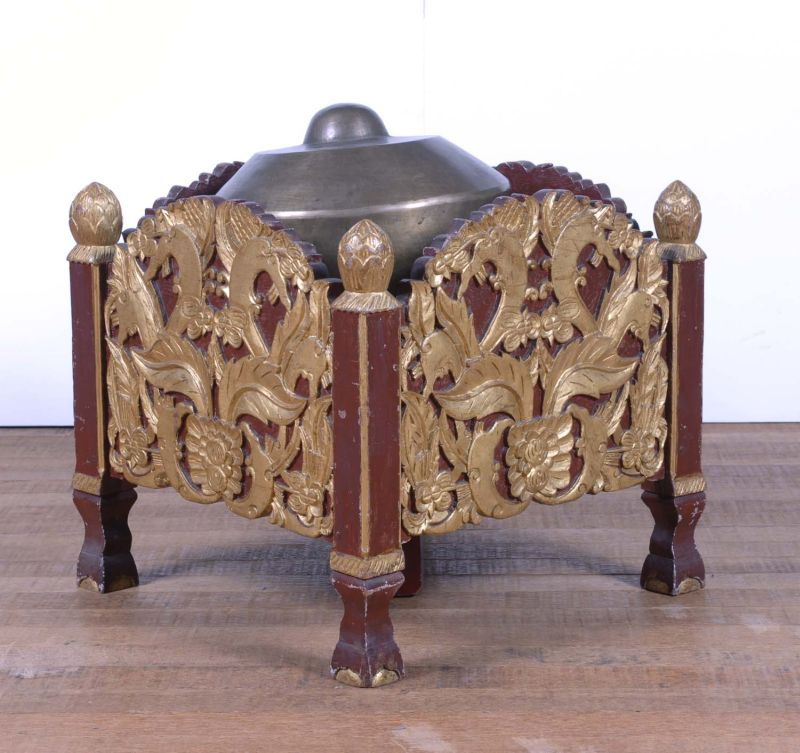
Kenong

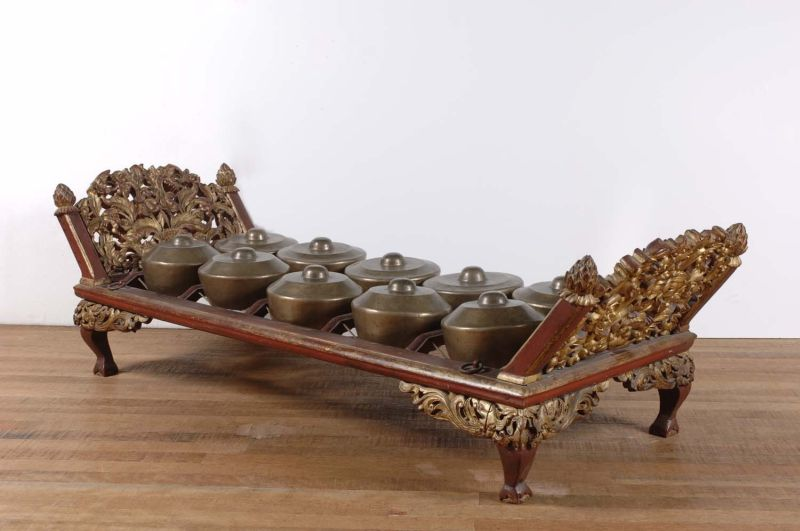
Bonang

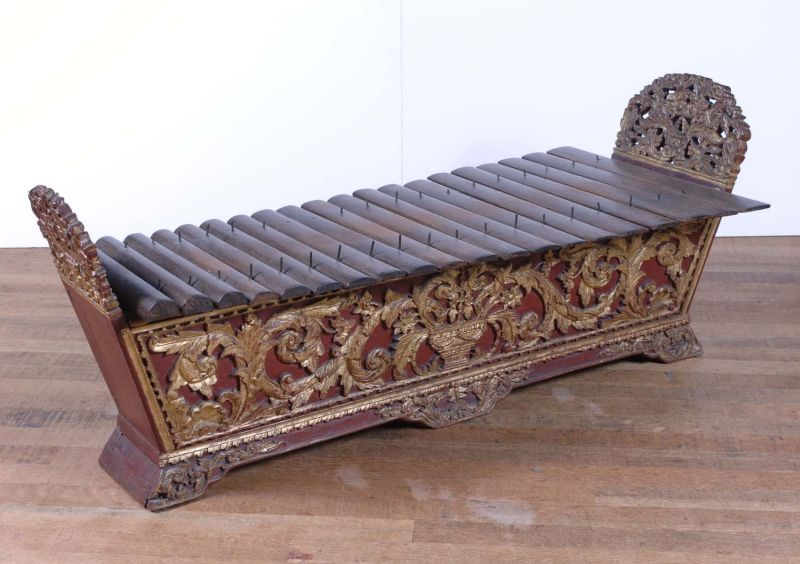
Gambang

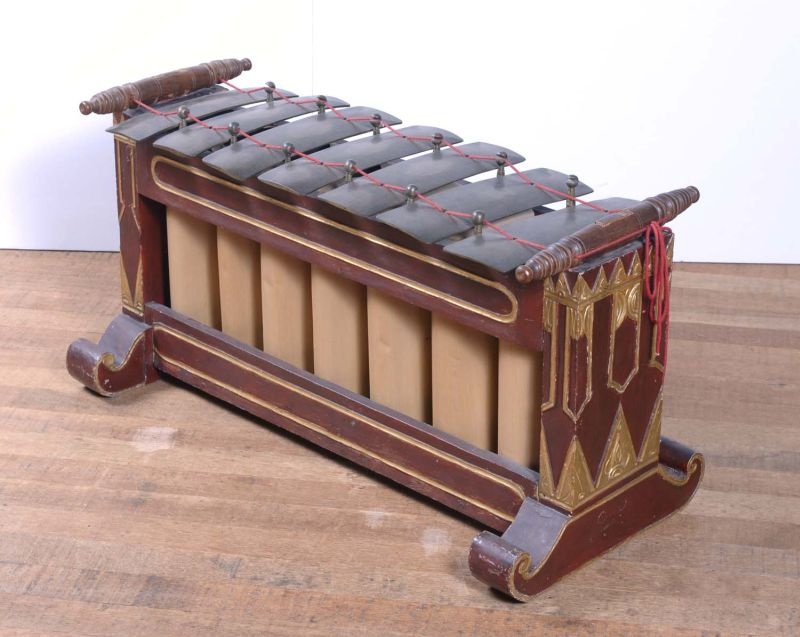
Gendèr

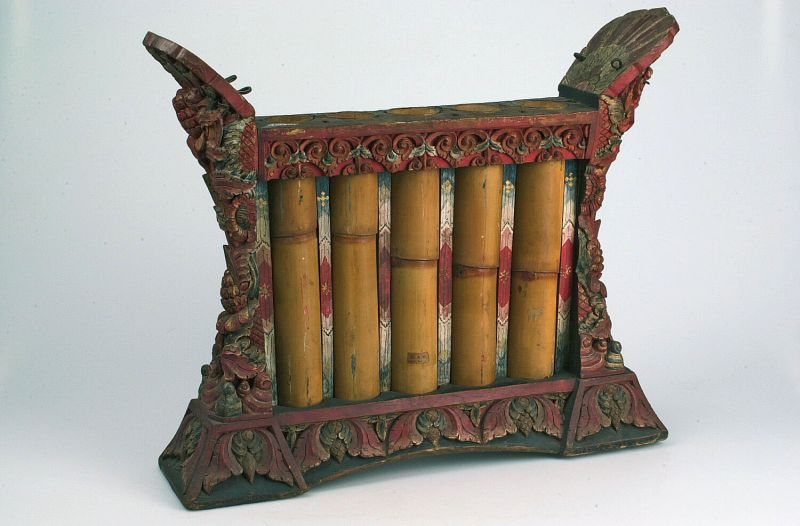
Calung

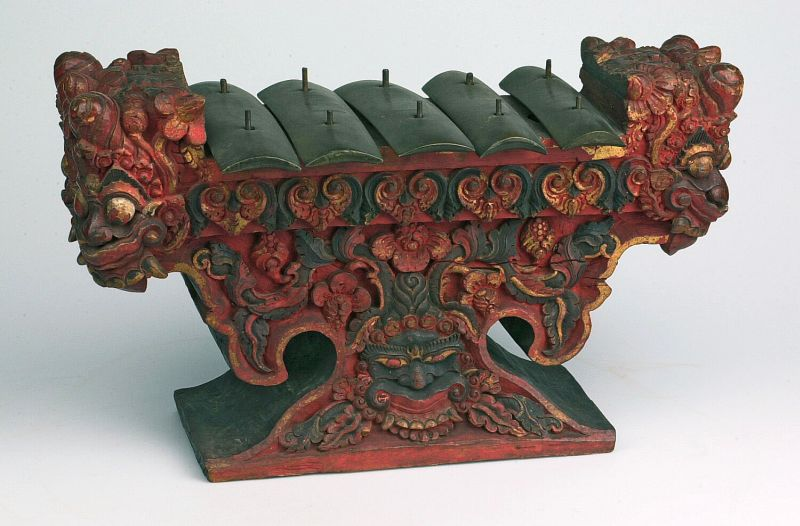
Gangsa

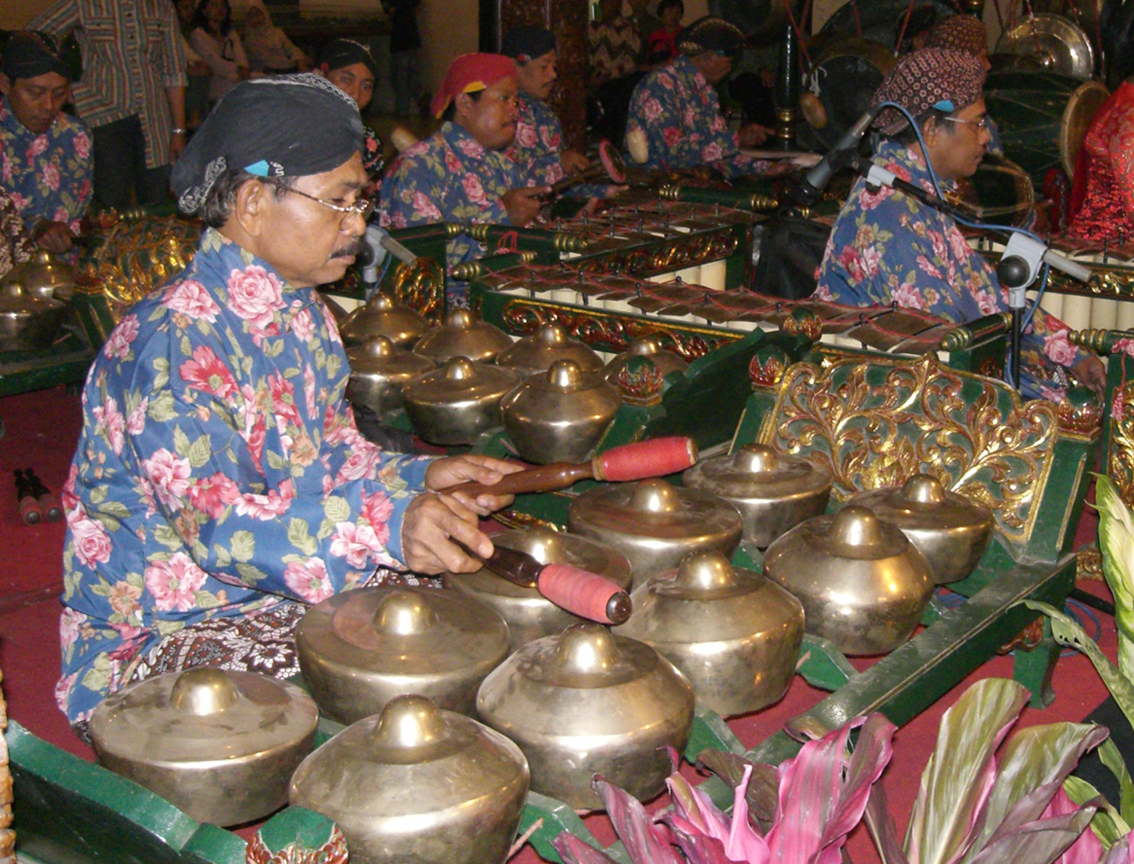
Gamelan, traditional music ensemble of Javanese, Sundanese, and Balinese people of Indonesia

Gamelan is a traditional Indonesian musical ensemble, primarily associated with Java and Bali. It consists of various percussion instruments, including metallophones such as gambang and bonang, as well as gongs like kenong and gong ageng. Gamelan plays a vital role in cultural and religious ceremonies, shadow puppet performances (wayang), and traditional dance. Its layered melodies and interlocking rhythms create a distinctive sound that has influenced both Indonesian and international music. Beyond its artistic value, gamelan is deeply embedded in local traditions and community gatherings. Recognized by UNESCO in 2021 as a Masterpiece of the Oral and Intangible Heritage of Humanity, gamelan remains an essential part of Indonesia's musical heritage.

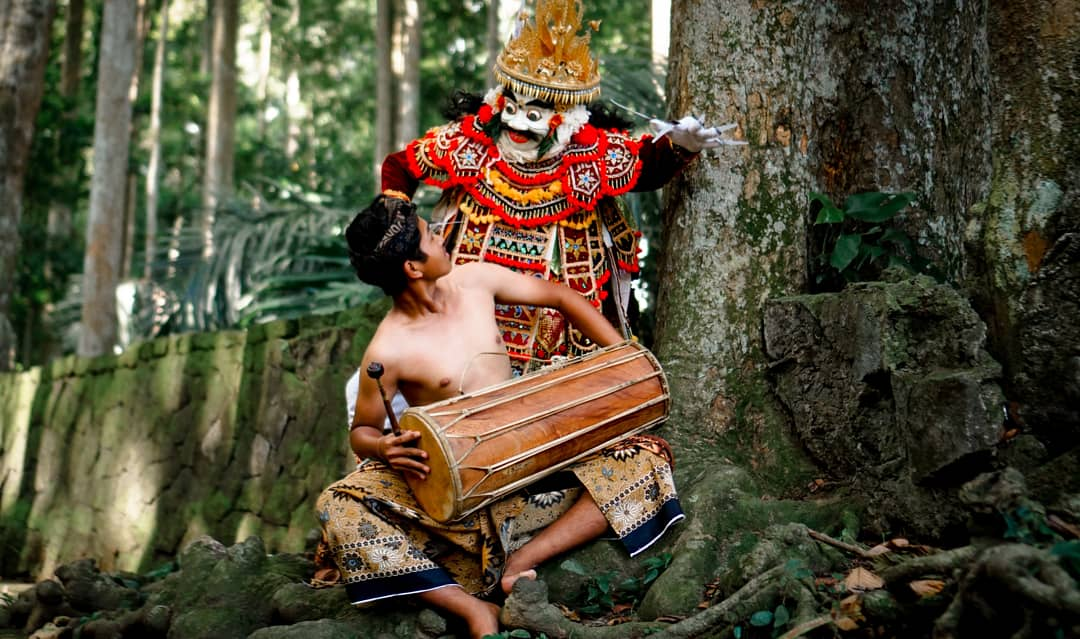
Kendang, a traditional Indonesian drum, is often used during traditional music performances

In West Sumatra, the Minangkabau people play talempong, a set of small knobbed gongs used in dance and ceremonies. Another key instrument is the saluang, a four-holed bamboo flute played with circular breathing, traditionally accompanying folk tales. In North Sumatra, the Batak people's music centres around gondang, a percussion ensemble of drums and gongs used in rituals. A notable variation is gordang sambilan, a set of nine large drums historically linked to royal ceremonies. The hasapi, a two-stringed wooden lute, is often played alongside singing in traditional Batak music. In Sulawesi, the Toraja people use pa’pompang, a bamboo instrument resembling a large flute ensemble with deep tones. The Bugis and Makassar people play the kacaping, a small plucked string instrument used in solo performances or to accompany storytelling. In Kalimantan, the Dayak people are known for the sape, a long-necked lute with intricate carvings, originally played in healing rituals and warrior dances but now popular in modern Dayak music. They also use gongs and other percussion instruments in communal events. In Papua, traditional music prominently features the tifa, a hand drum made from hollowed wood and animal skin, played in rhythmic patterns for dances and rituals. Bamboo wind instruments, such as flutes and panpipes, are also commonly used.

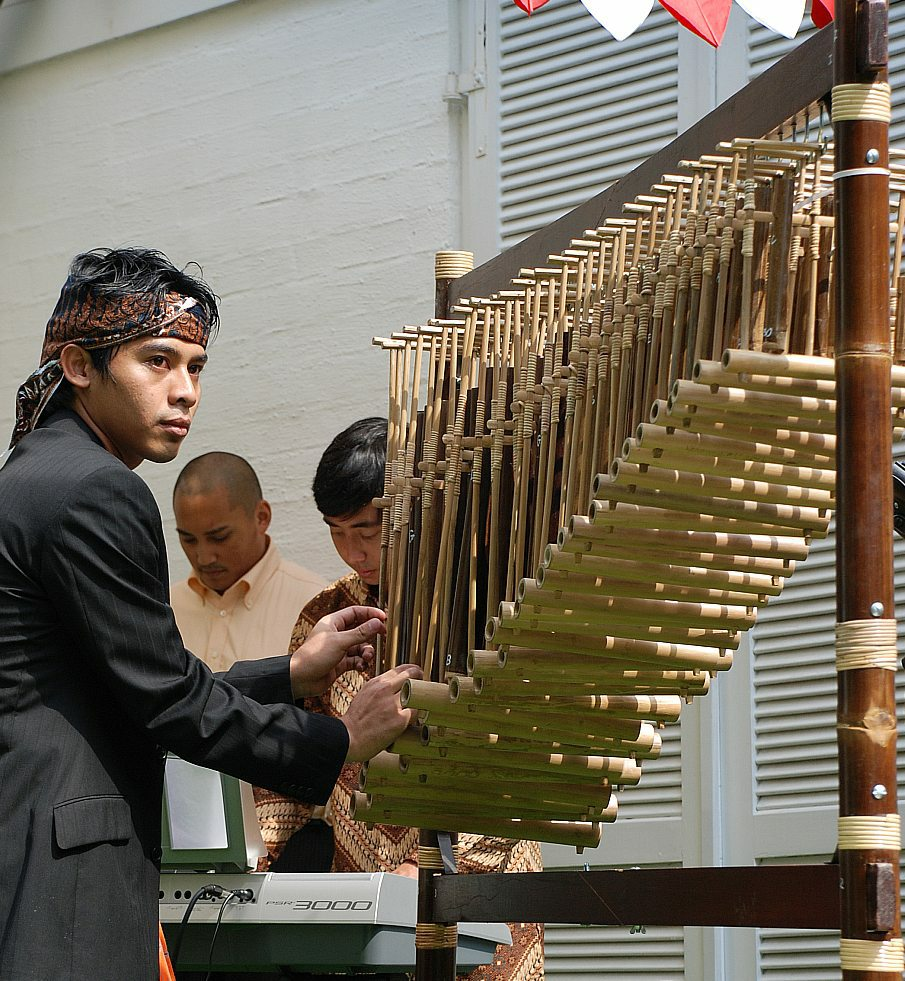
Angklung, a Sundanese bamboo musical instrument from West Java.

The angklung, a traditional musical instrument from West Java made from bamboo, has received international recognition from UNESCO as part of the intangible cultural heritage. Another unique instrument is the Sasando from East Nusa Tenggara, a harp-like instrument made from a split Lontar palm leaf, known for its soft, flowing melodies.

Kroncong is a traditional Indonesian music genre featuring guitars, ukuleles, and a distinctive rhythmic style. Introduced by Portuguese traders in the 15th century, it developed into regional styles such as Keroncong Tugu in North Jakarta and Maluku, which retain strong Portuguese influences. Another well-known variation is Keroncong Kemayoran from Jakarta. A modern adaptation, Pop Kroncong, blends traditional kroncong with contemporary element.

Other notable traditional music genres in Indonesia include Tanjidor from Betawi culture in Jakarta featuring a brass and woodwind ensemble, and Jaipongan from West Java, which blends Sundanese music with dance. In the 1960s, Indonesia's music scene evolved with modern kroncong and pop influences. On June 29, 1965, the band Koes Plus was imprisoned in Glodok, West Jakarta, for playing Western-style music, which was banned under Sukarno’s government. After his resignation, the restrictions were lifted, and Koes Plus became pioneers of Indonesian pop music.

Dangdut emerged in the 1970s, blending Javanese, Malay, Indian, and Arabic musical influences. Originating in Java, it quickly gained nationwide popularity with its distinctive drum beats and flute melodies. The genre later spread to neighbouring countries such as Malaysia, Singapore, and Brunei and has gained international recognition through diaspora communities and collaborations with global musicians.

Some examples of Indonesian traditional music instruments

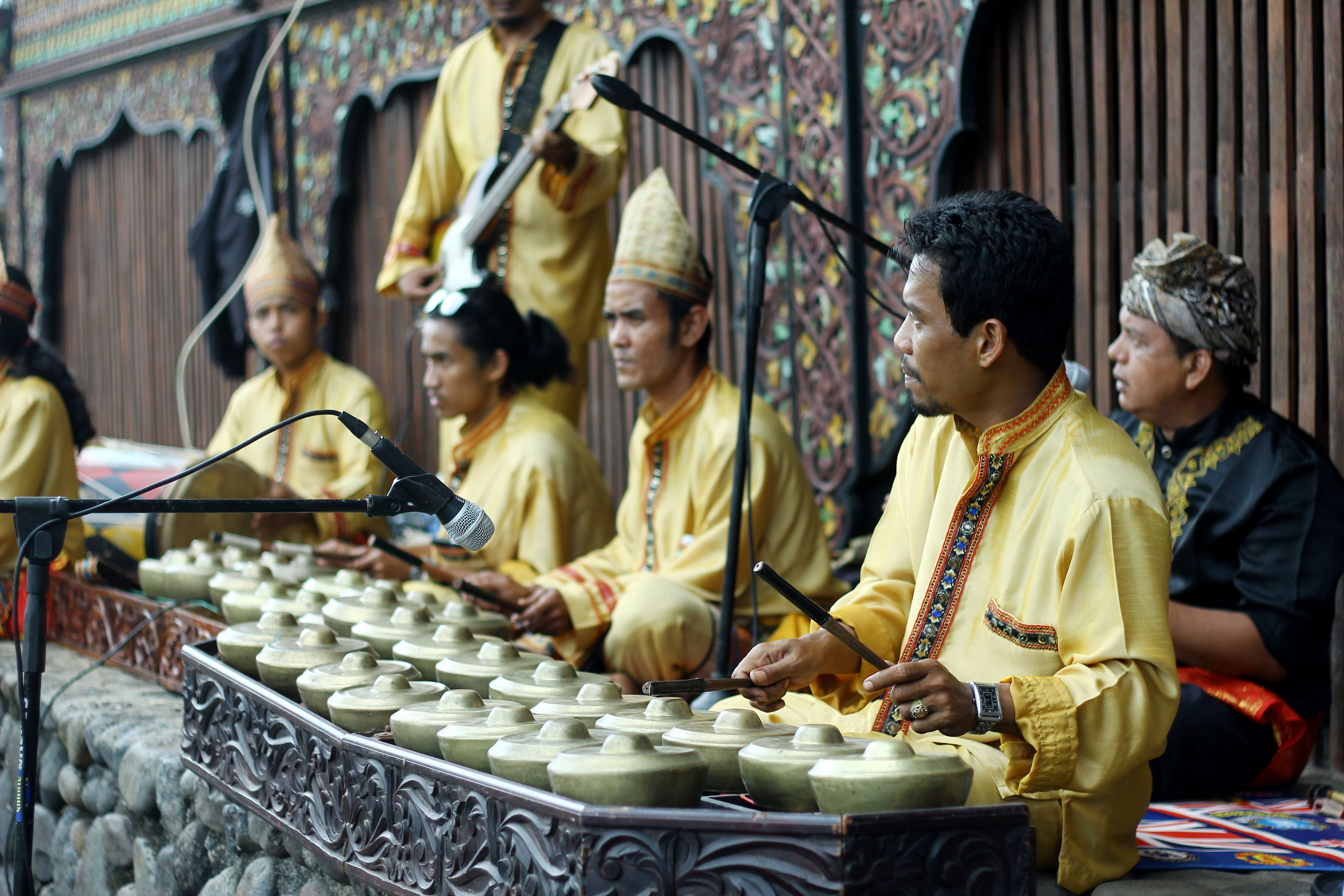
Talempong, a traditional percussion instrument from West Sumatra

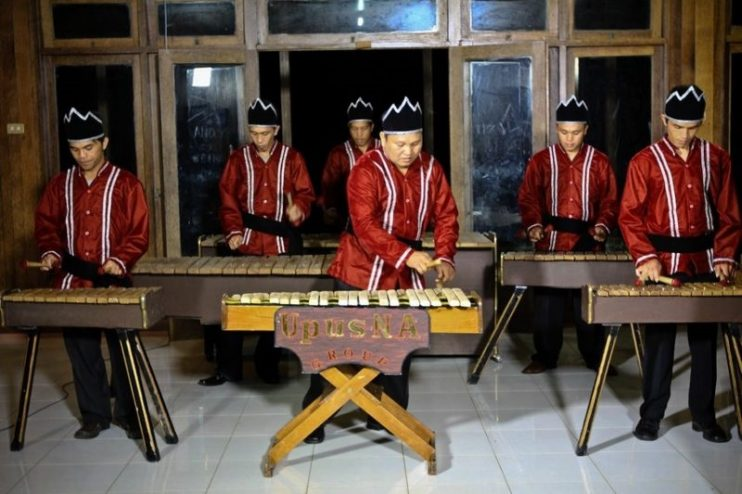
Kolintang, a traditional xylophone-like instrument from North Sulawesi

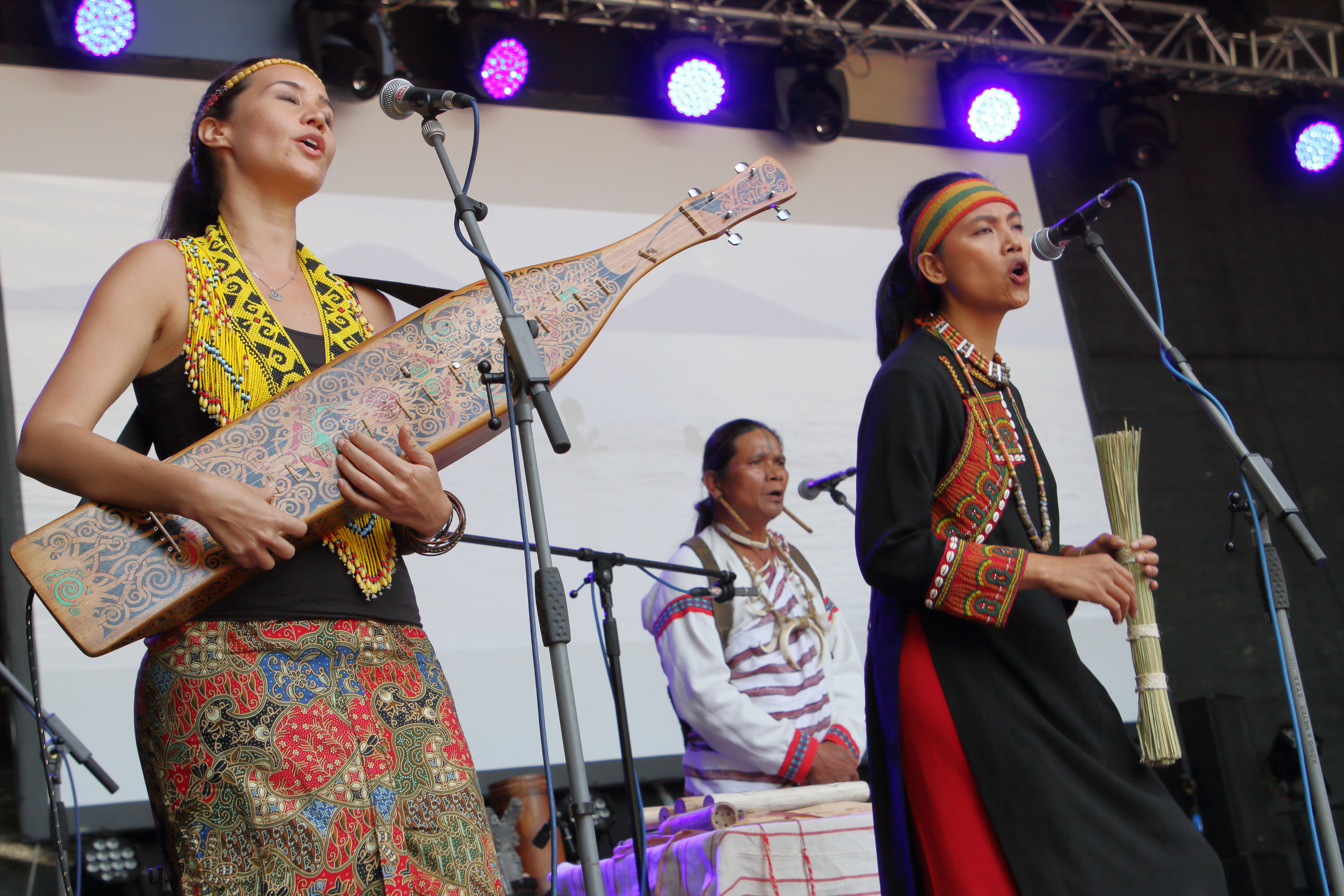
Sapeh, a traditional stringed instrument from East Kalimantan

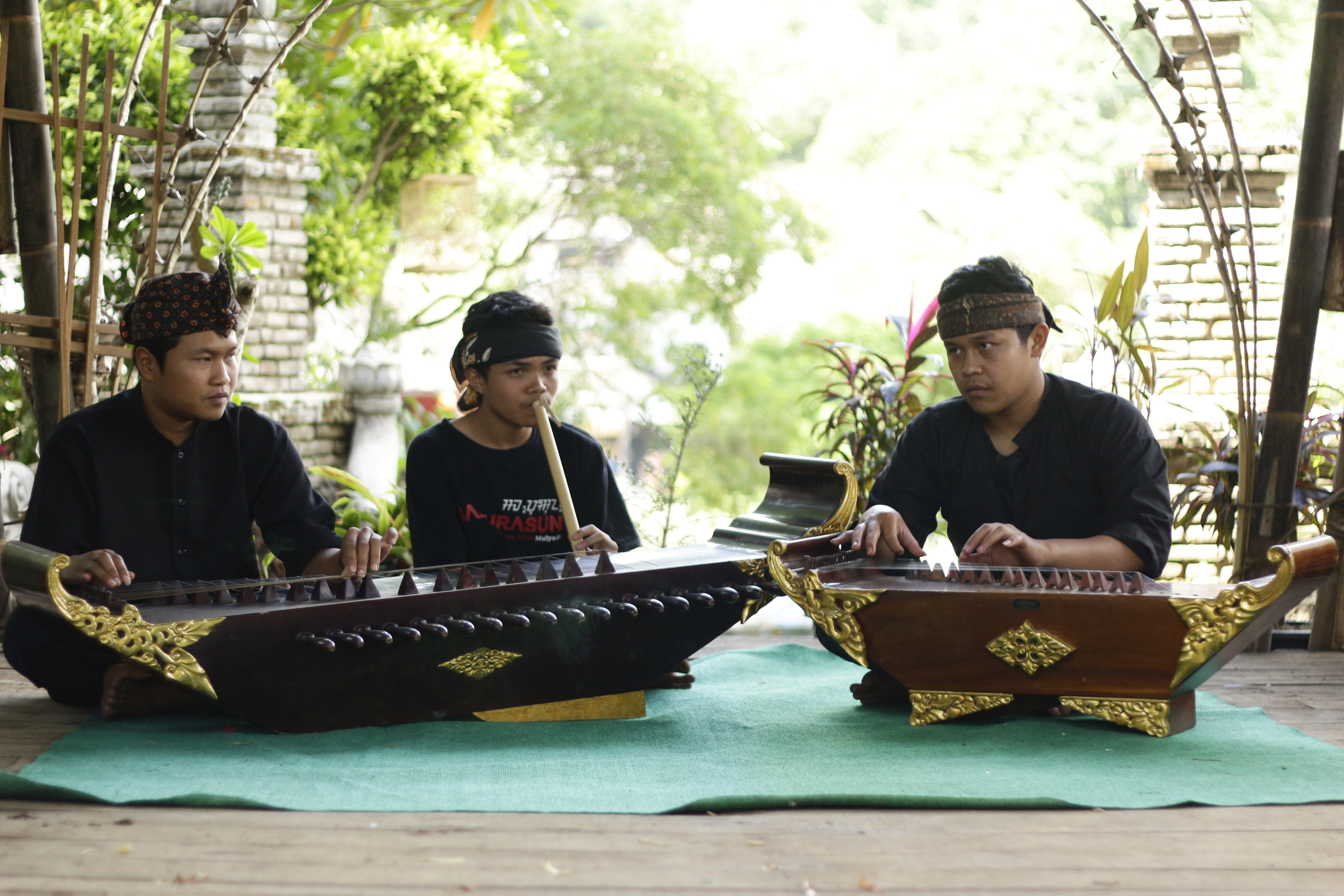
Kacapi and suling, traditional musical instruments from Banten and West Java

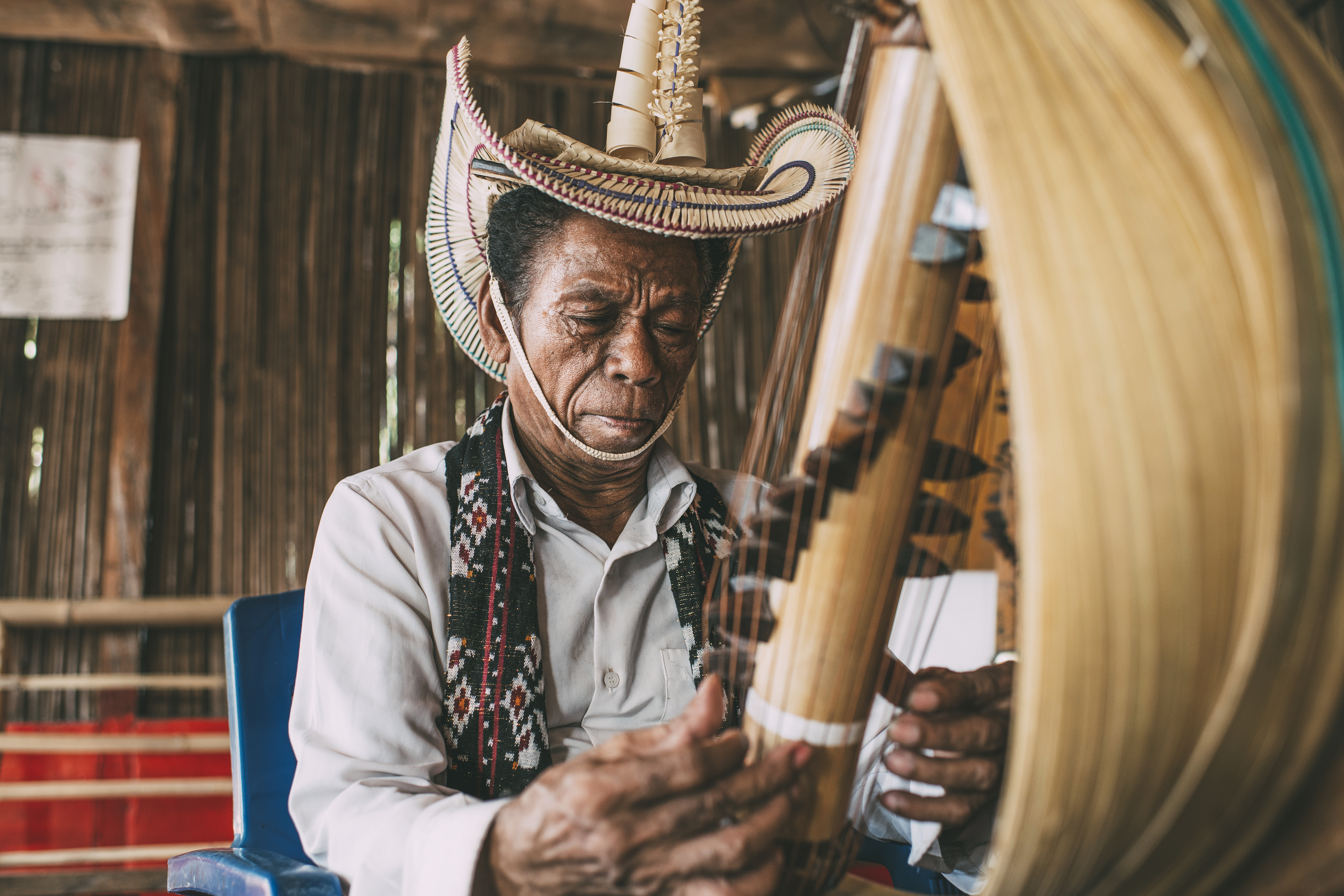
Sasando, a traditional stringed instrument from East Nusa Tenggara.

=== Dance ===
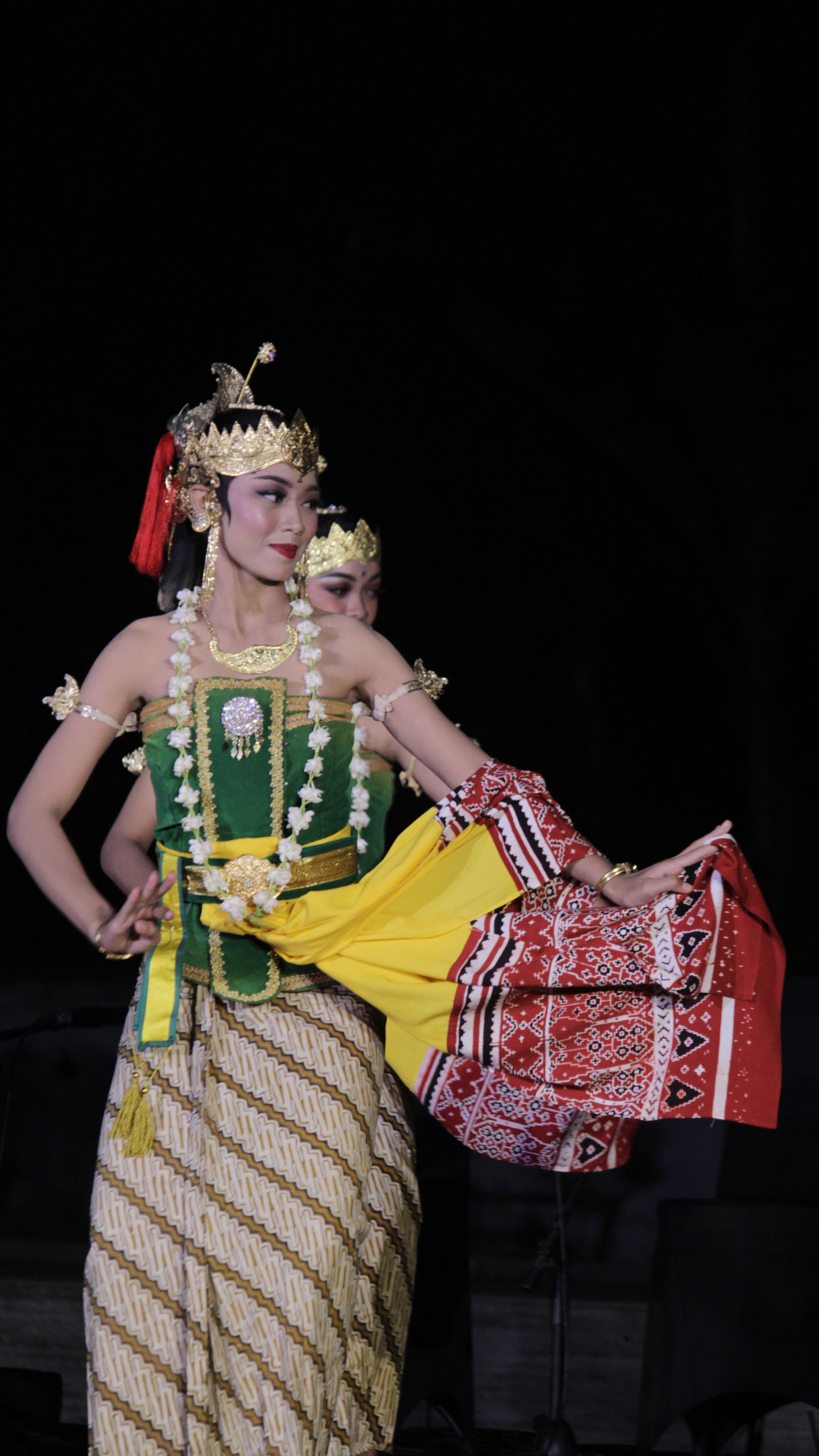
Serimpi, a classical Javanese dance performed by women in traditional ancient Javanese attire.

Indonesian dance reflects the rich diversity of culture from the many ethnic groups that compose the nation of Indonesia. The dances showcase Austronesian roots, Melanesian tribal dance forms, and influences from foreign countries such as Indian subcontinent, Mainland China, and the Middle East, as well as European styles introduced during colonization. With over 3,000 distinct dances, each ethnic group contributes its own unique styles and traditions. Indonesian dances can be categorized into three historical eras: the Prehistoric Era, the Hindu-Buddhist Era, and the Islamic Era, and they fall into two main genres: court dance and folk dance.

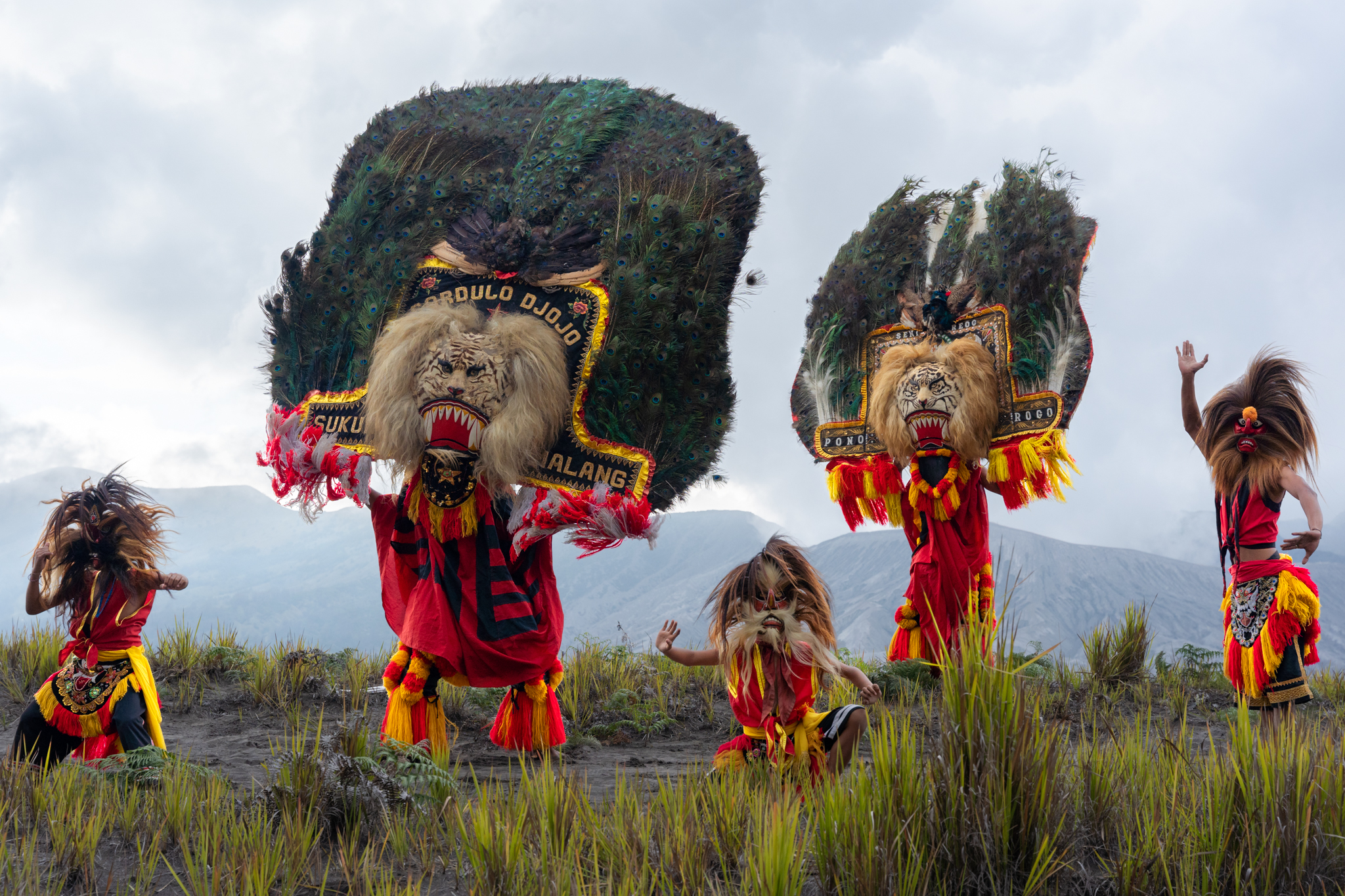
Reog from East Java.

In West Sumatra, Tari Piring (plate dance) is performed with dancers balancing plates while executing fast, precise movements. In Aceh, the Saman dance is known for its rapid, synchronized hand and body motions and was recognized by UNESCO in 2011 as an Intangible Cultural Heritage in Need of Urgent Safeguarding. The Batak people's Tor-tor dance involves rhythmic footwork and deliberate gestures, often performed in rituals and celebrations. In Riau, the Melayu dance is characterized by fluid, elegant gestures, commonly seen in formal ceremonies. Zapin, performed in Jambi and Bangka Belitung, blends Arabic and local influences with lively footwork. In South Sumatra, Gending Sriwijaya reflects the legacy of the Srivijaya Empire, featuring graceful choreography set to rhythmic melodies.

In Java, Bedhaya and Serimpi are performed in the royal courts of Yogyakarta and Surakarta. Bedhaya, a sacred dance, is characterized by slow, deliberate movements that reflect spiritual harmony. Serimpi, known for its elegance, portrays Javanese mythology and royal traditions through refined gestures and synchronized patterns.

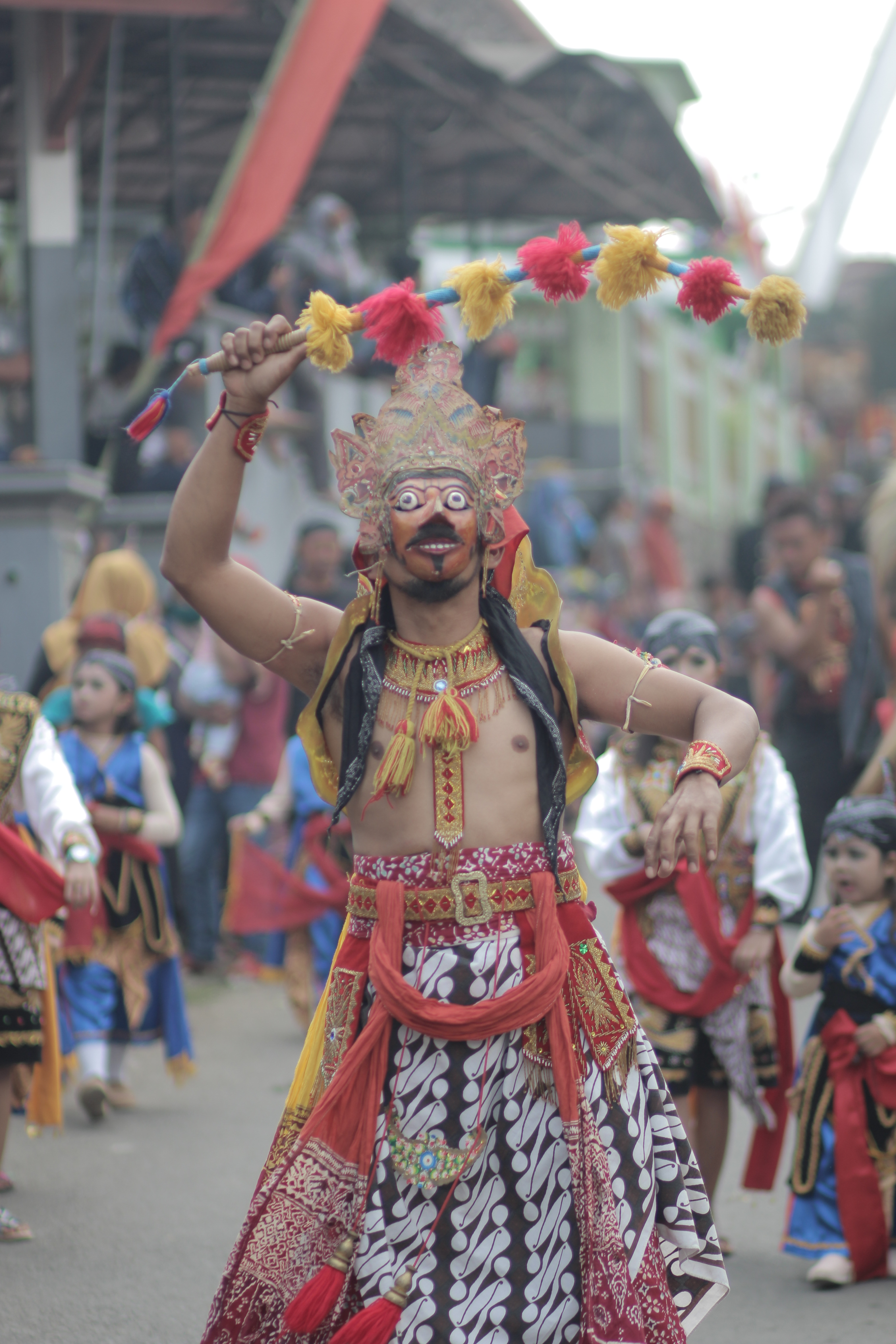
Cirebonese Topeng dance performance

The Topeng (mask dance) is a traditional Javanese performance where dancers wear masks to portray characters from Javanese folklore, history, and mythology. Accompanied by gamelan, this dance blends drama and theatrical elements. Gambyong, a traditional dance from Surakarta, is performed in welcoming ceremonies and festive events, characterized by smooth, flowing movements. Kuda Lumping (Kepang Jaran) depicts riders on woven bamboo horses, often incorporating trance performances. Reog, from Ponorogo, features the massive "Singa Barong" (Javanese lion) mask, weighing over 30 kg, held by a performer using their teeth, alongside bold choreography and powerful percussion.

Examples of Balinese Dances

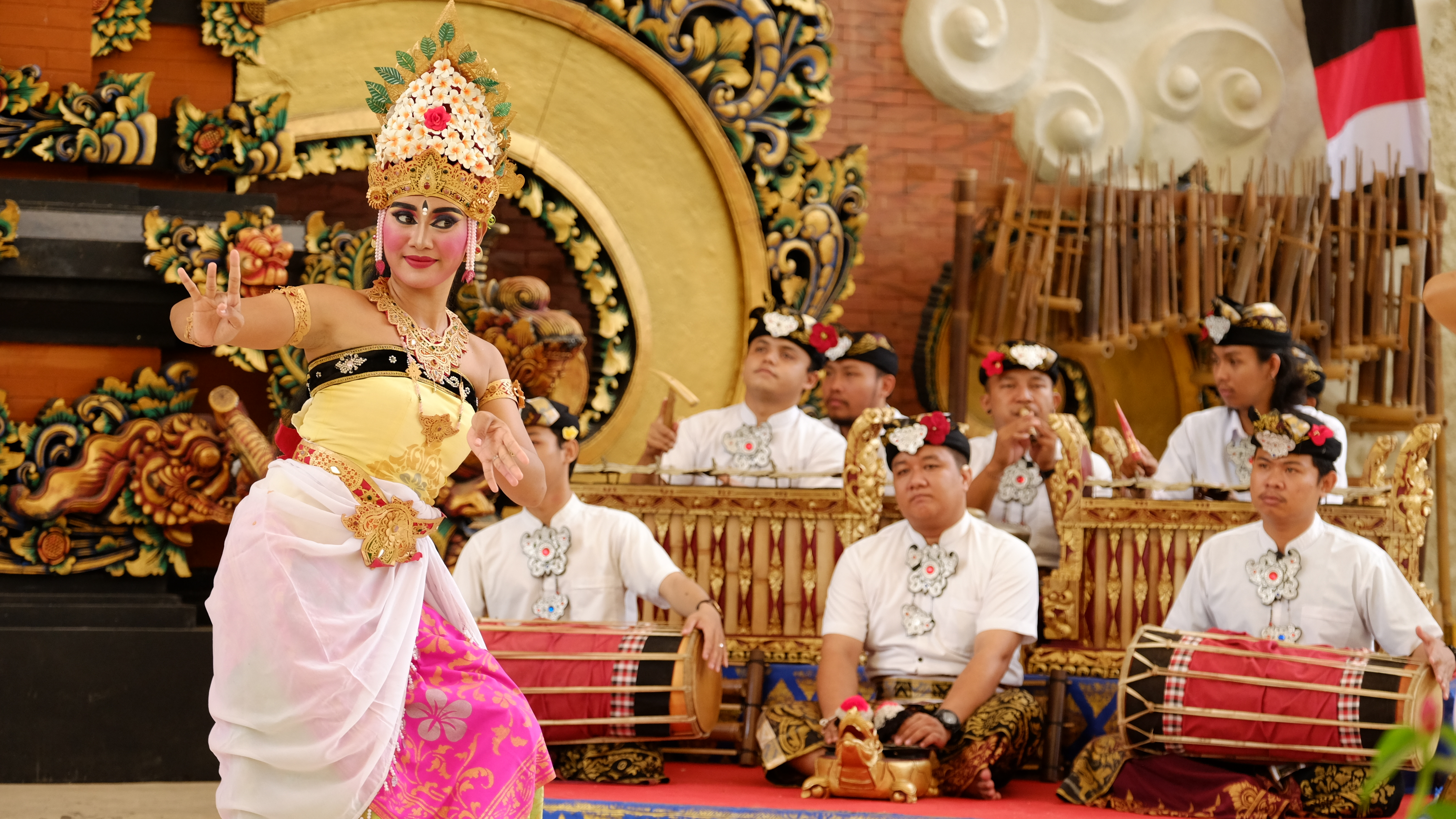
Sekar Jepun

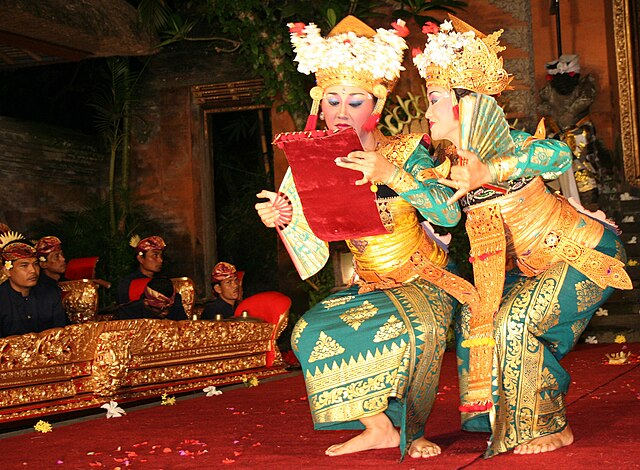
Legong

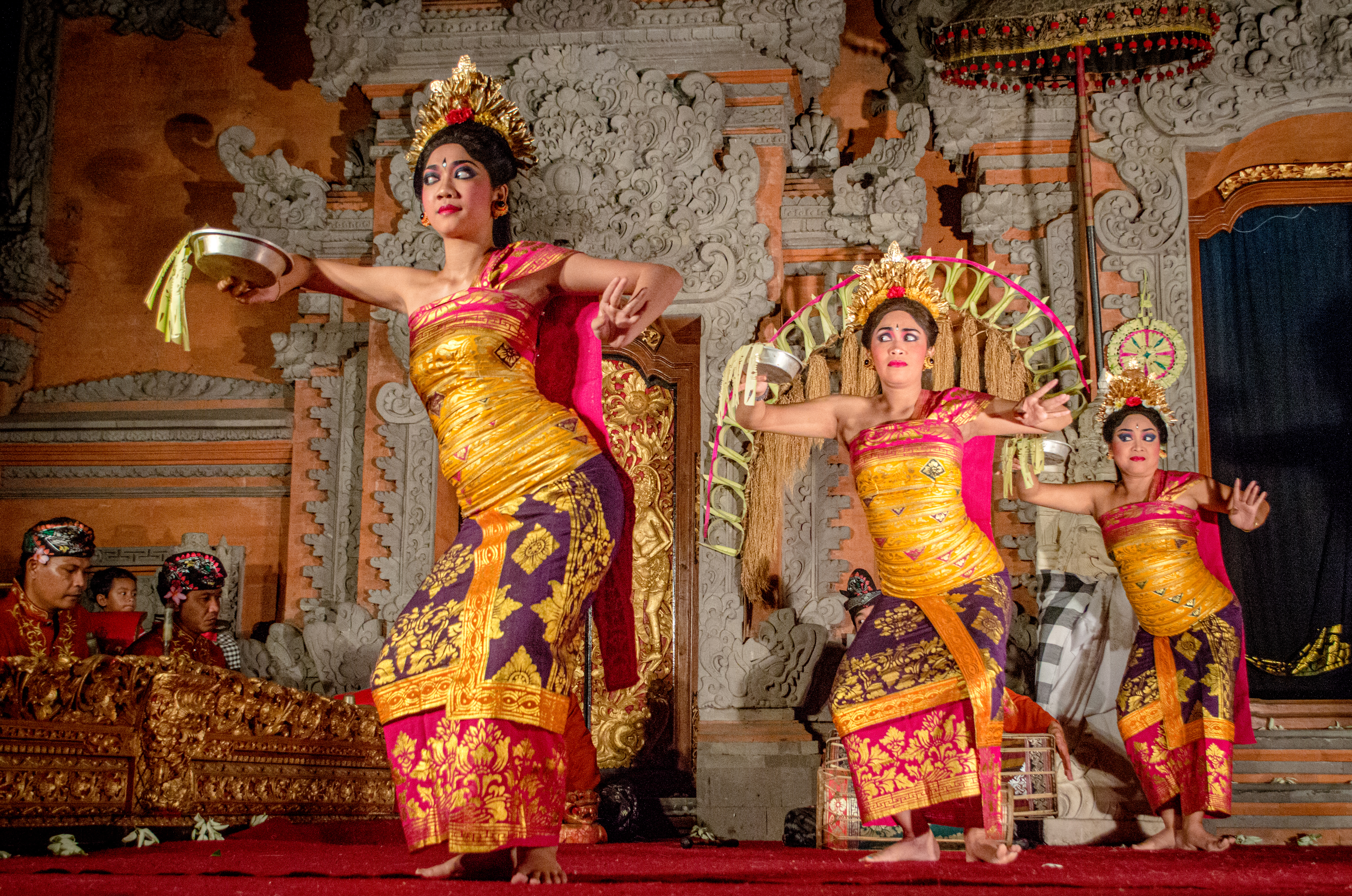
Pendet

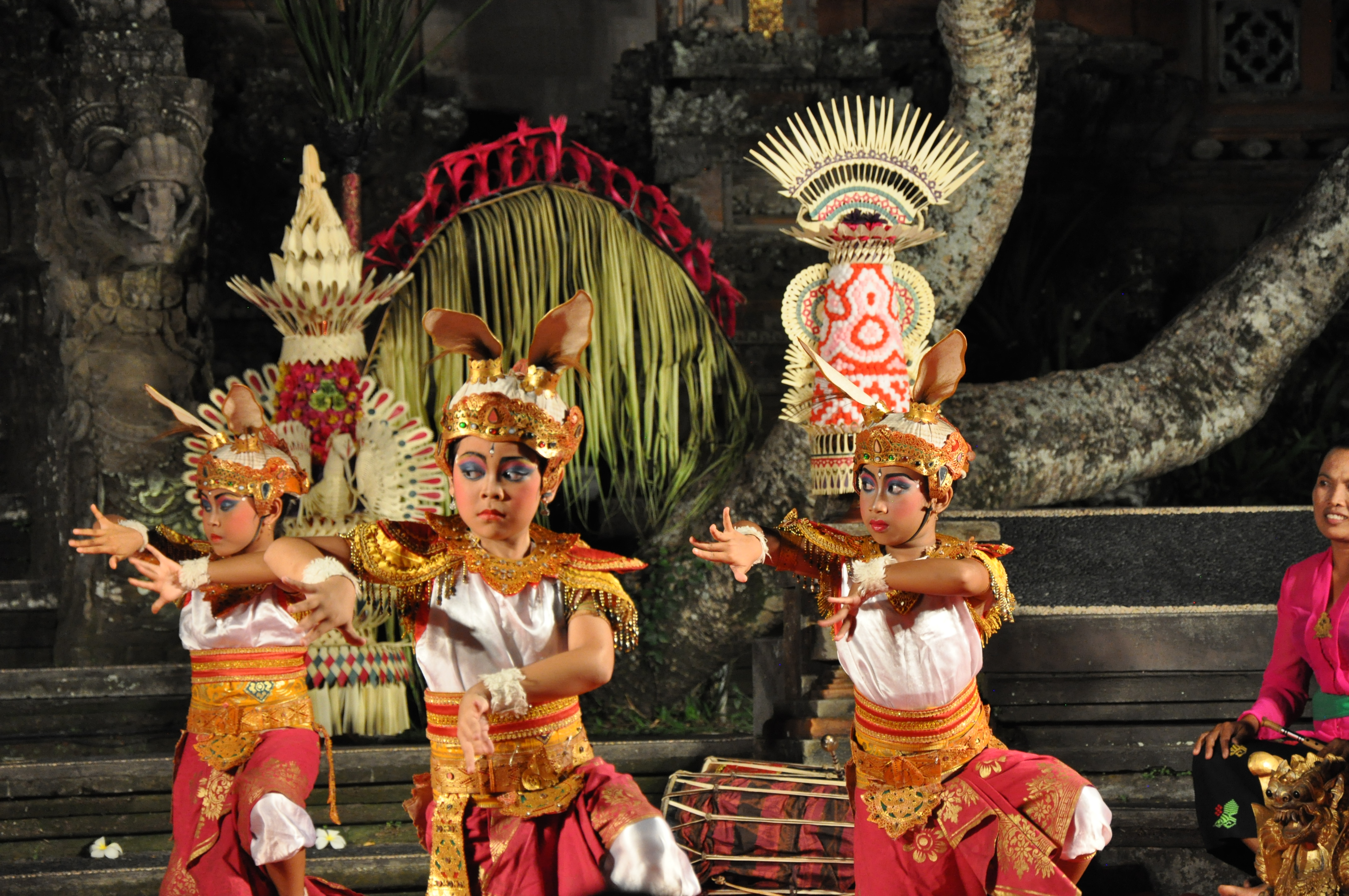
Joged

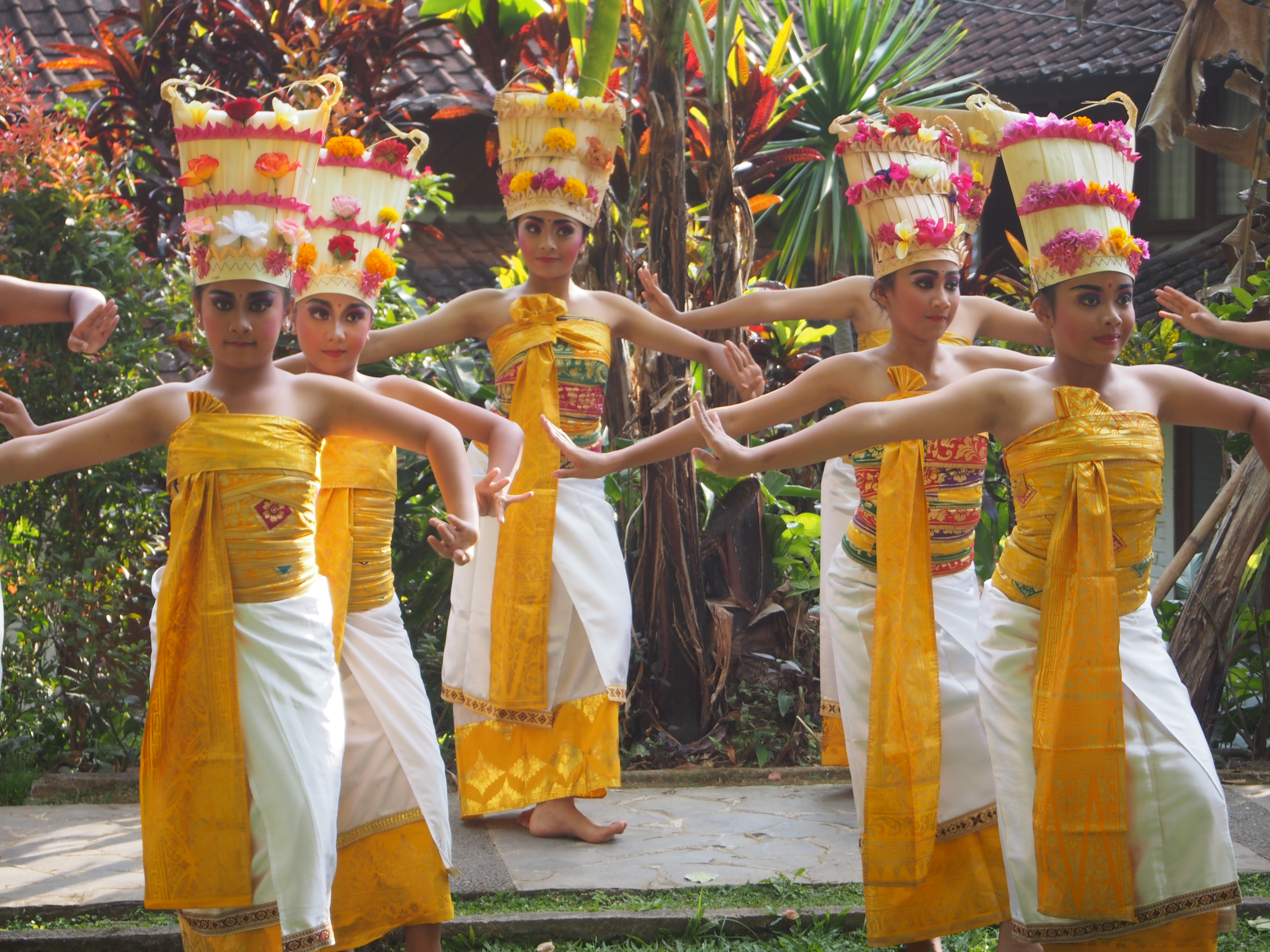
Rejang

In Bali, traditional dance is deeply woven into religious and cultural life, categorized into Wali (sacred), Bebali (semi-sacred), and Balih-balihan (entertainment). UNESCO recognized these dance traditions as Intangible Cultural Heritage in 2015. Legong is distinguished by its intricate finger movements and precise footwork, often used to depict mythical tales. The Barong dance, a dramatic portrayal of the struggle between Barong (good) and Rangda (evil), features elaborate costumes and dynamic movements.

The Kecak dance, or the “Ramayana Monkey Chant,” is one of Bali's most iconic performances. This dynamic dance-drama features a large group of men chanting “cak” in unison, creating a mesmerizing rhythm that drives the storytelling. Inspired by scenes from the Hindu epic Ramayana, Kecak is not just a dance but a powerful theatrical experience, often performed against the dramatic backdrop of Bali's temples at sunset.

The Dayak people of Kalimantan perform the Hudoq dance, a masked ritual meant to invite spirits and ensure a good harvest. The Kancet Papatai dance reenacts scenes of ancient Dayak warriors, featuring energetic movements and traditional weapons. The Banjar people are known for Baksa kembang, a graceful dance performed at weddings and ceremonies, incorporating delicate hand movements and floral decorations as a symbol of beauty and prosperity.

In Sulawesi, Dero is a circle dance of the Kaili people in Central Sulawesi, performed during celebrations. In South Sulawesi, the Bugis Pakarena is a traditional dance with slow, graceful movements, performed by female dancers in elaborate costumes to the accompaniment of drum and flute music. Paraga from Makassar involves skillful footwork with a rattan ball, similar to sepak raga. Bosara, a traditional Bugis-Makassar dance, is performed by women with elegant hand gestures around a bosara (decorative tray), symbolizing hospitality and respect, often at welcoming ceremonies.

In the Maluku Islands, Cakalele is a war dance performed with shields and swords. Poco-Poco, a line dance from Ambon, became popular across Indonesia and internationally, especially in Southeast Asia. It is often performed in group exercises, social gatherings, and military drills. The dance gained attention in Malaysia but was banned in 2011 by some religious authorities due to perceived Christian influences. Despite this, Poco-Poco remains a beloved dance for recreation and fitness. In North Maluku, the Gala dance from the Sula Islands is traditionally performed to welcome guests and celebrate harvests or other festivities, with male and female dancers paired together.

In Papua, Sajojo is a popular group dance with energetic steps, often performed at festivals. Yospan is a social dance featuring dynamic footwork and leaps, commonly used to welcome guests. The War Dance of the Dani and Yali tribes involves stomping, spear formations, and rhythmic drumming. Tumbu Tanah, a highland dance, is performed by stomping the ground in unison to create a steady beat.

Some examples of Indonesian Traditional dance

Ratoh Jaroe, a traditional dance from Aceh

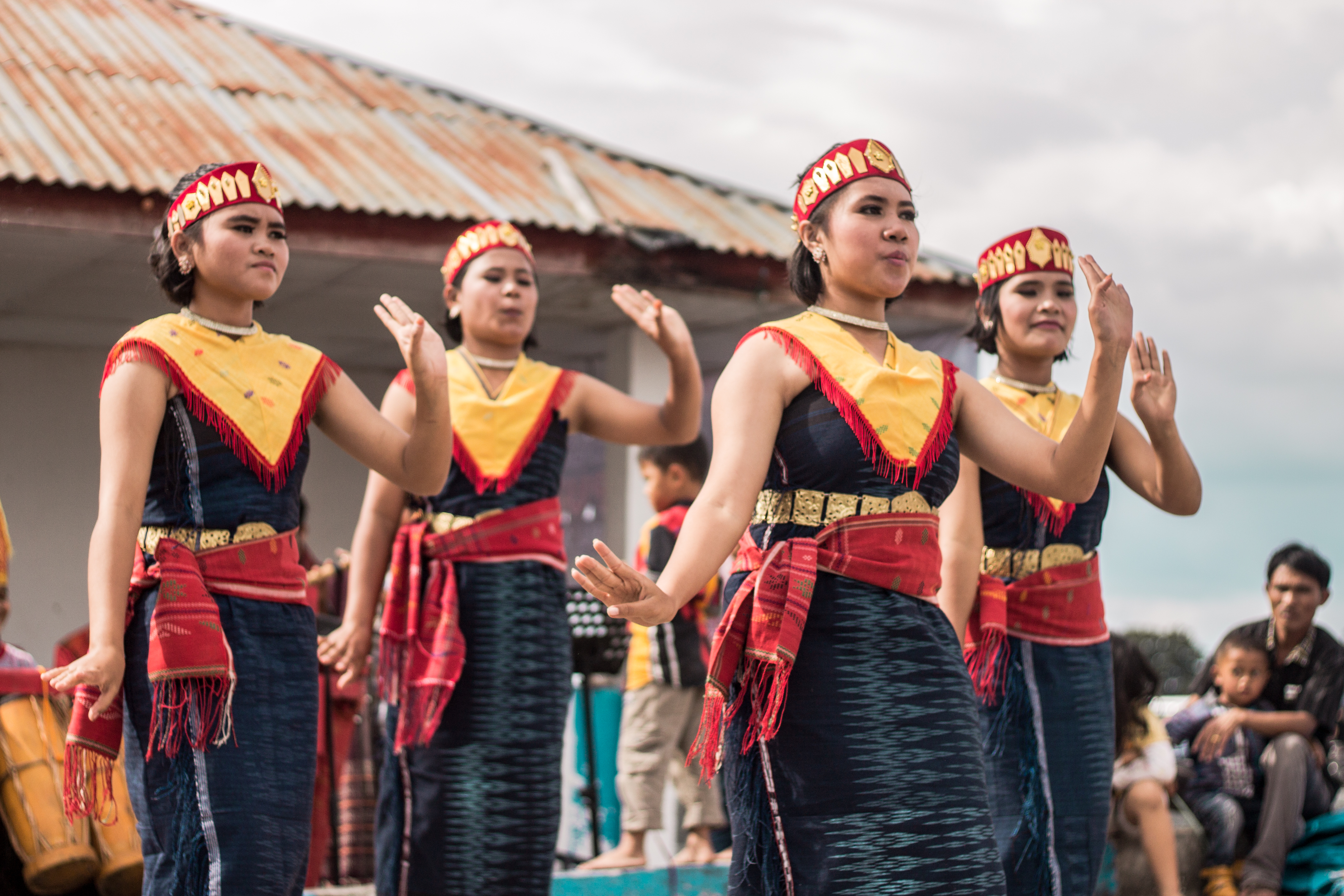
Tor-tor dance, a traditional dance from North Sumatra

Piring dance, a traditional dance from West Sumatra

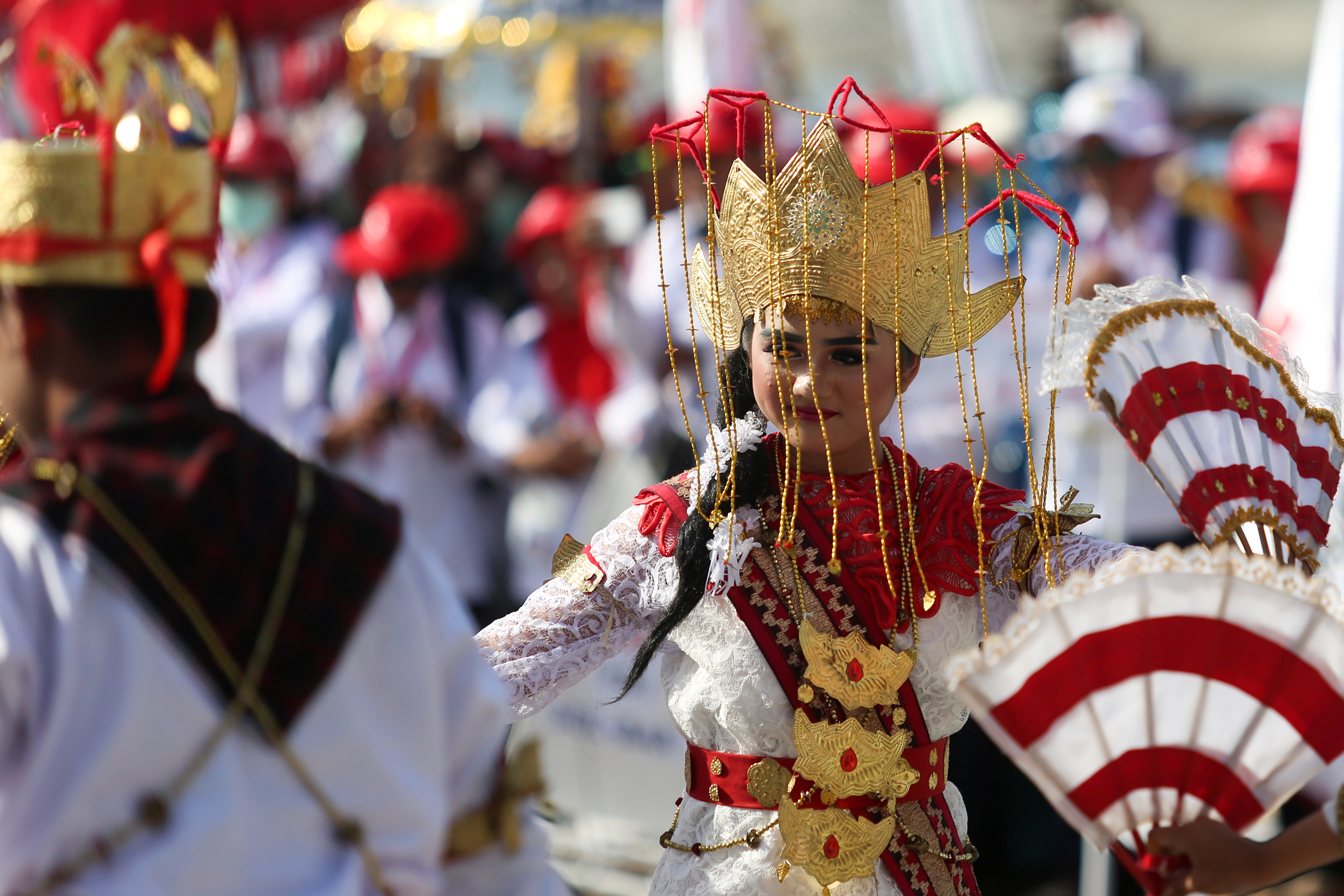
Melinting, a traditional dance from Lampung

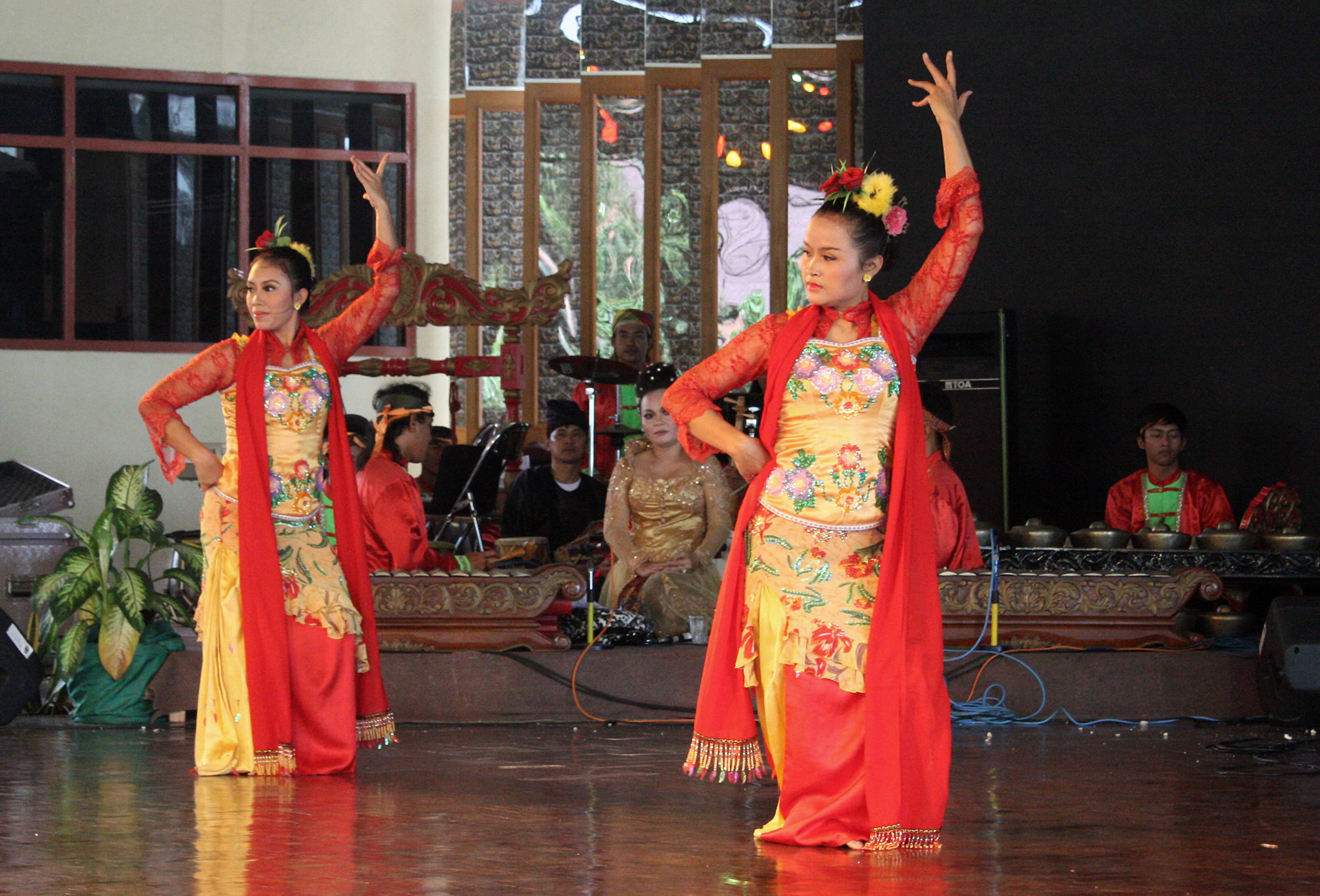
Jaipongan, a traditional dance from West Java

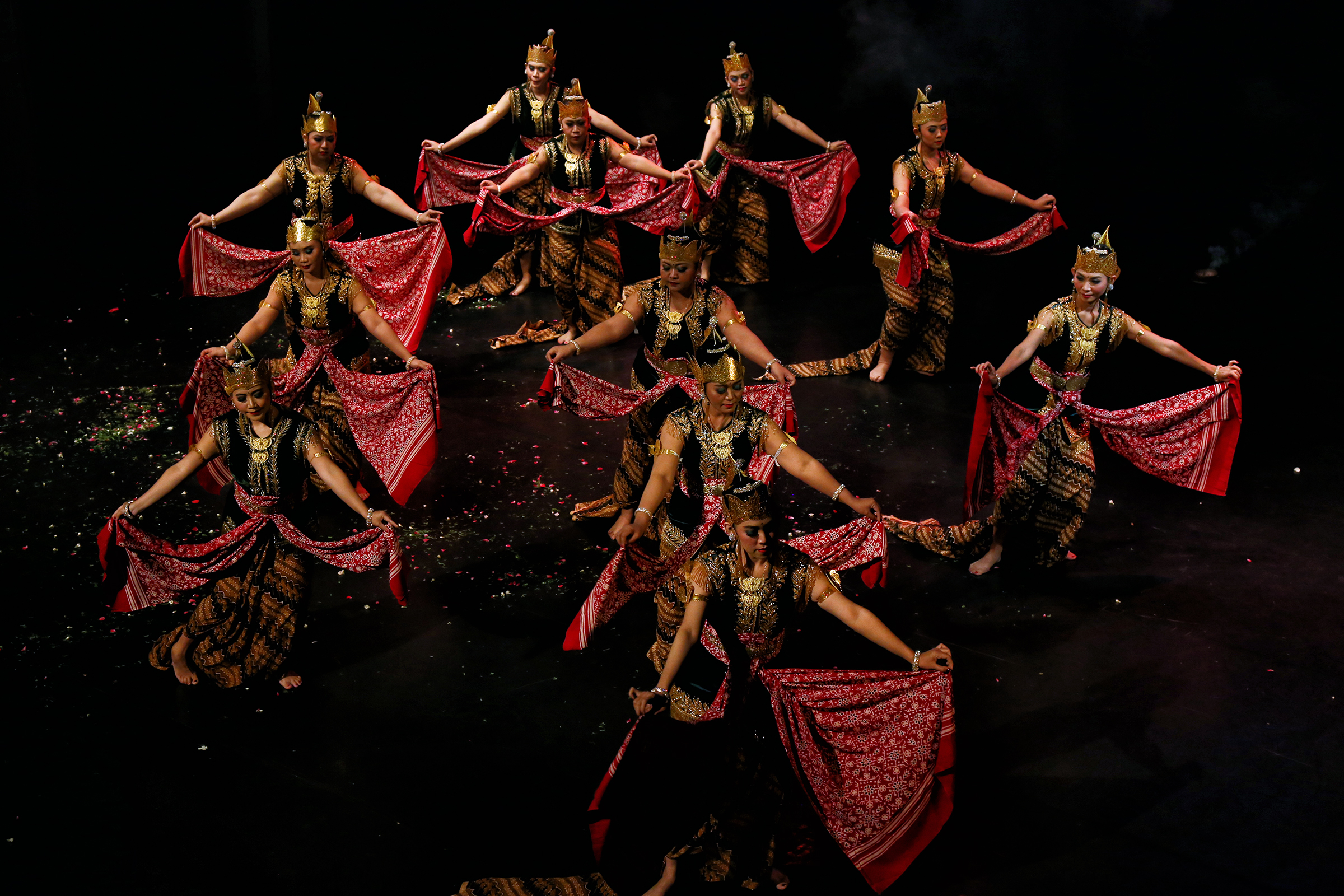
Bedhaya, a classical Javanese dance

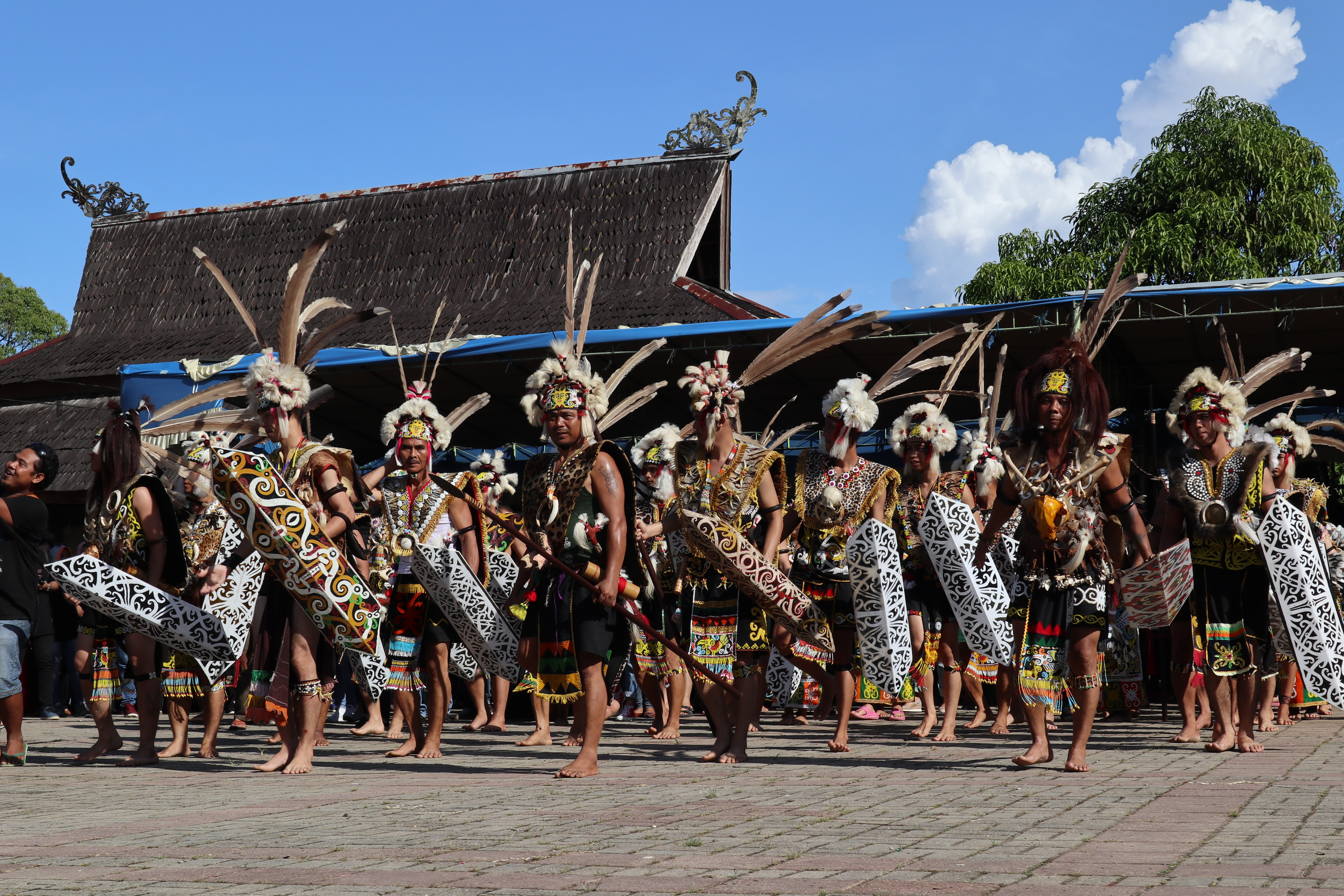
Dayak war dance from Kalimantan

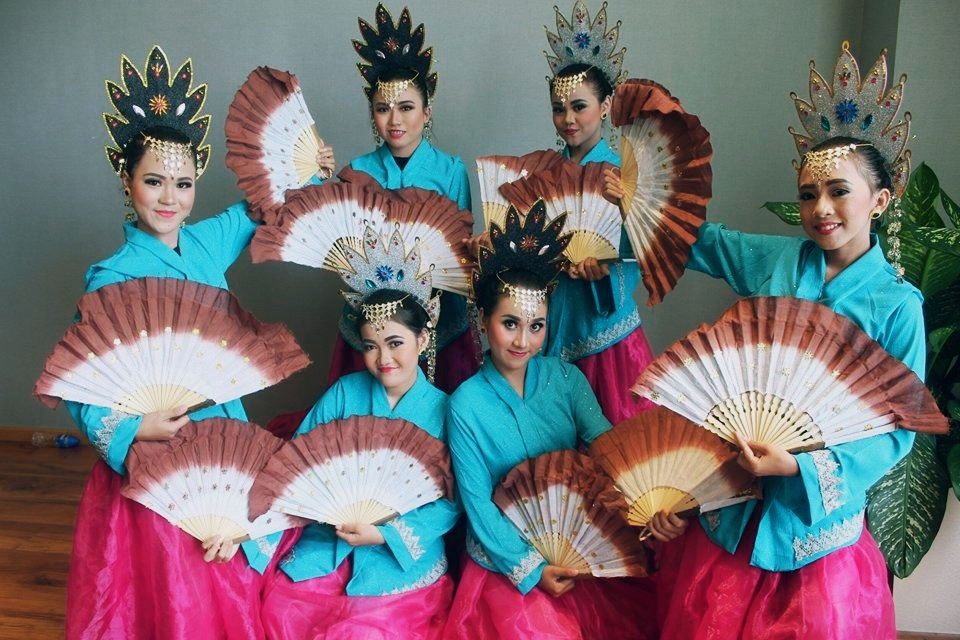
Pakarena, a traditional Bugis-Makassar dance from South Sulawesi

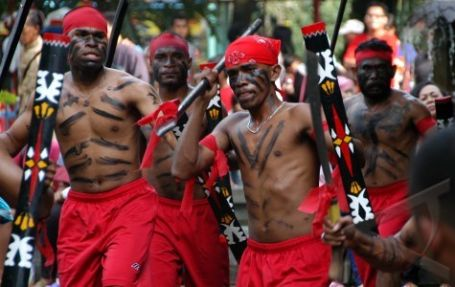
Cakalele, a traditional war dance from Maluku Islands

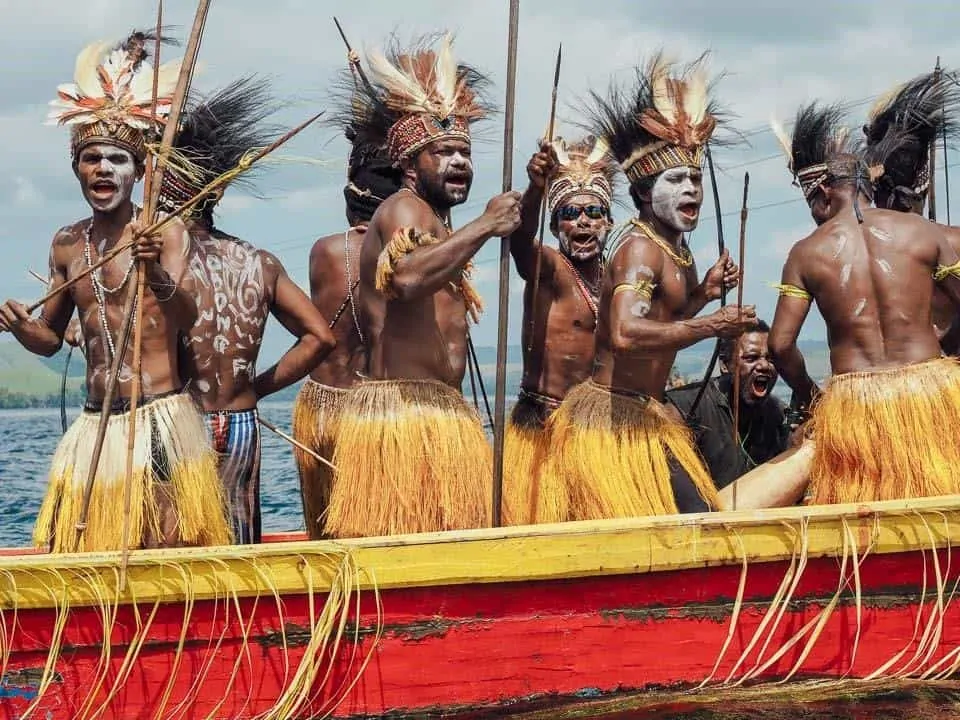
Awaijale Rilejale dance, a traditional dance from West Papua

=== Drama and theatre ===
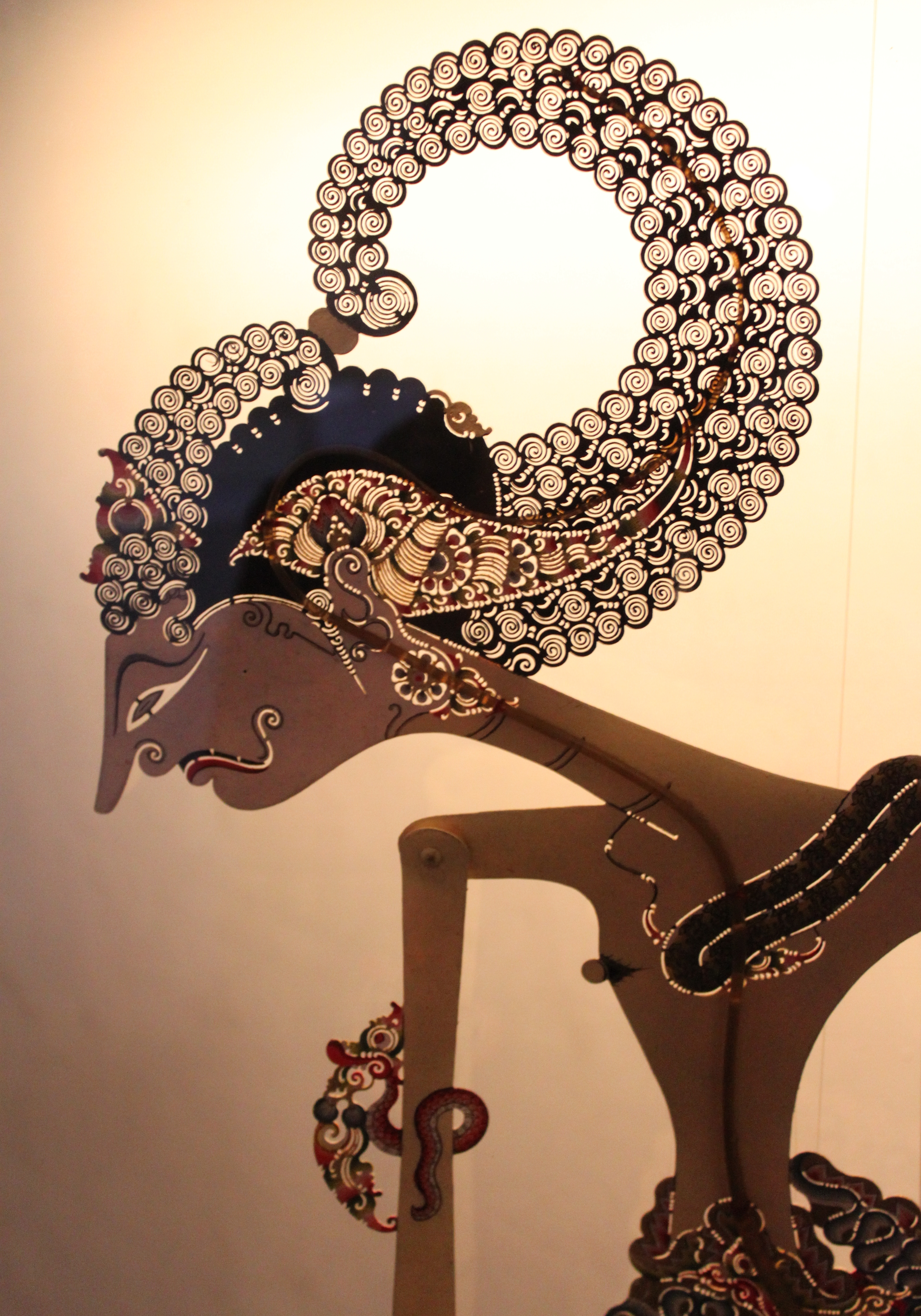
Indonesian Javanese wayang kulit shadow puppet.

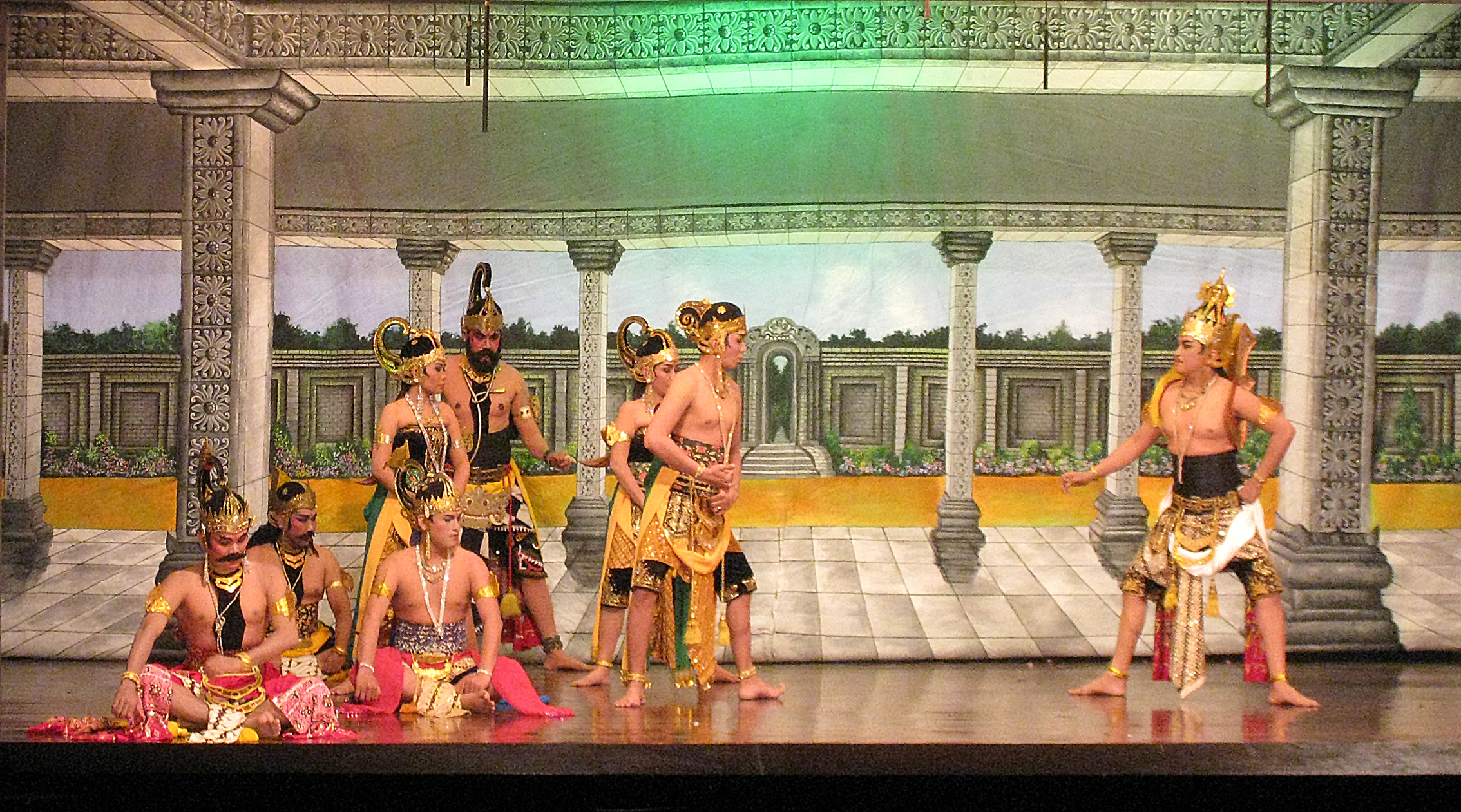
Pandava and Krishna in an act of the Wayang Wong performance

Wayang is a traditional shadow puppet theatre from the Javanese, Sundanese, and Balinese cultures, depicting stories from the Ramayana, Mahabharata, and local folklore. Wayang kulit, the most well-known form, uses intricately carved leather puppets mounted on bamboo sticks, manipulated behind a lit screen to cast moving shadows. The performances, led by a dalang (puppet master), serve as both entertainment and a medium for conveying moral and philosophical teachings. Recognized by UNESCO as a Masterpiece of the Oral and Intangible Heritage of Humanity, wayang remains an integral part of Indonesian cultural heritage.

Wayang wong, or "human wayang", is a form of Javanese theatre that adapts wayang stories into live dance dramas performed by actors. This tradition incorporates elaborate costumes, stylized movements, and traditional music to portray mythological tales and convey moral teachings. Performances are accompanied by a gamelan orchestra, which enhances the storytelling through rhythmic melodies. The dalang (puppet master) plays a central role, narrating the story, voicing characters, and guiding the overall performance

Ludruk, a theatrical tradition from East Java, blends comedy, drama, and audience interaction through improvised dialogue and local humour. Ketoprak, another Javanese theatre form, incorporates music, dance, and historical or folkloric storytelling.

In West Java, Sundanese Sandiwara portrays historical and mythological tales through music and drama, while Lenong from Betawi features humorous storytelling, often with social satire. Ondel-ondel, a Betawi folk performance, showcases giant puppet figures paraded during festivals as a symbol of cultural heritage.

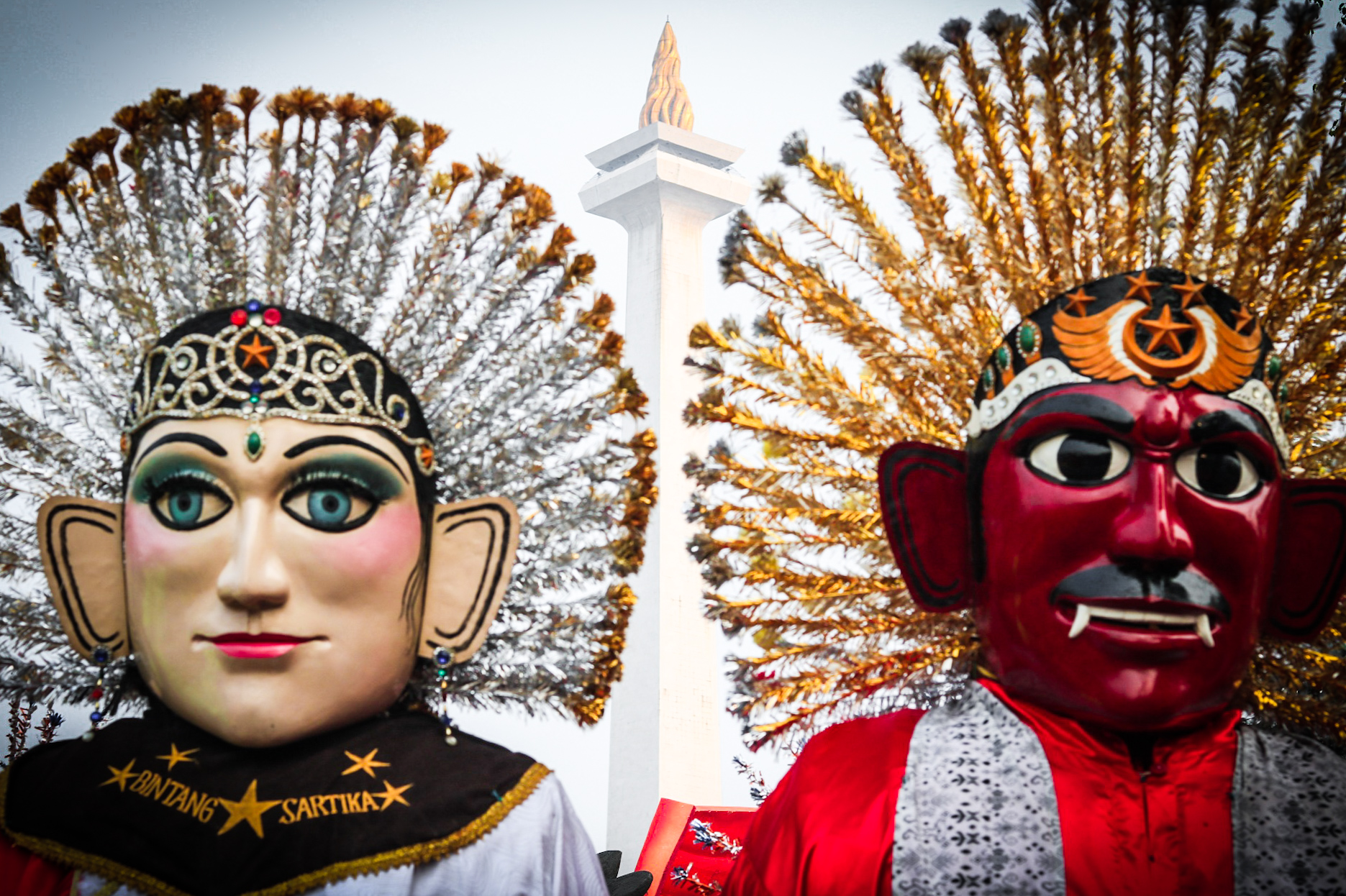
Ondel-ondel, a large puppet figure featured in Betawi folk performance

In West Sumatra, Randai integrates drama, music, dance, and the martial art "silek" (pencak silat), typically depicting Minangkabau legends. Bangsawan, popular in Riau and Malay-speaking regions, combines drama and music to present romantic or historical narratives.

Bali's theatrical traditions, deeply tied to dance and music, often retell epic stories with elaborate performances.

Modern performing art also developed in Indonesia with its distinct style of drama. Notable theatre, dance, and drama troupe such as Teater Koma are gaining popularity in Indonesia as their drama often portray social and political satires of Indonesian society.

Some examples of Indonesian Dance Drama and Theatre

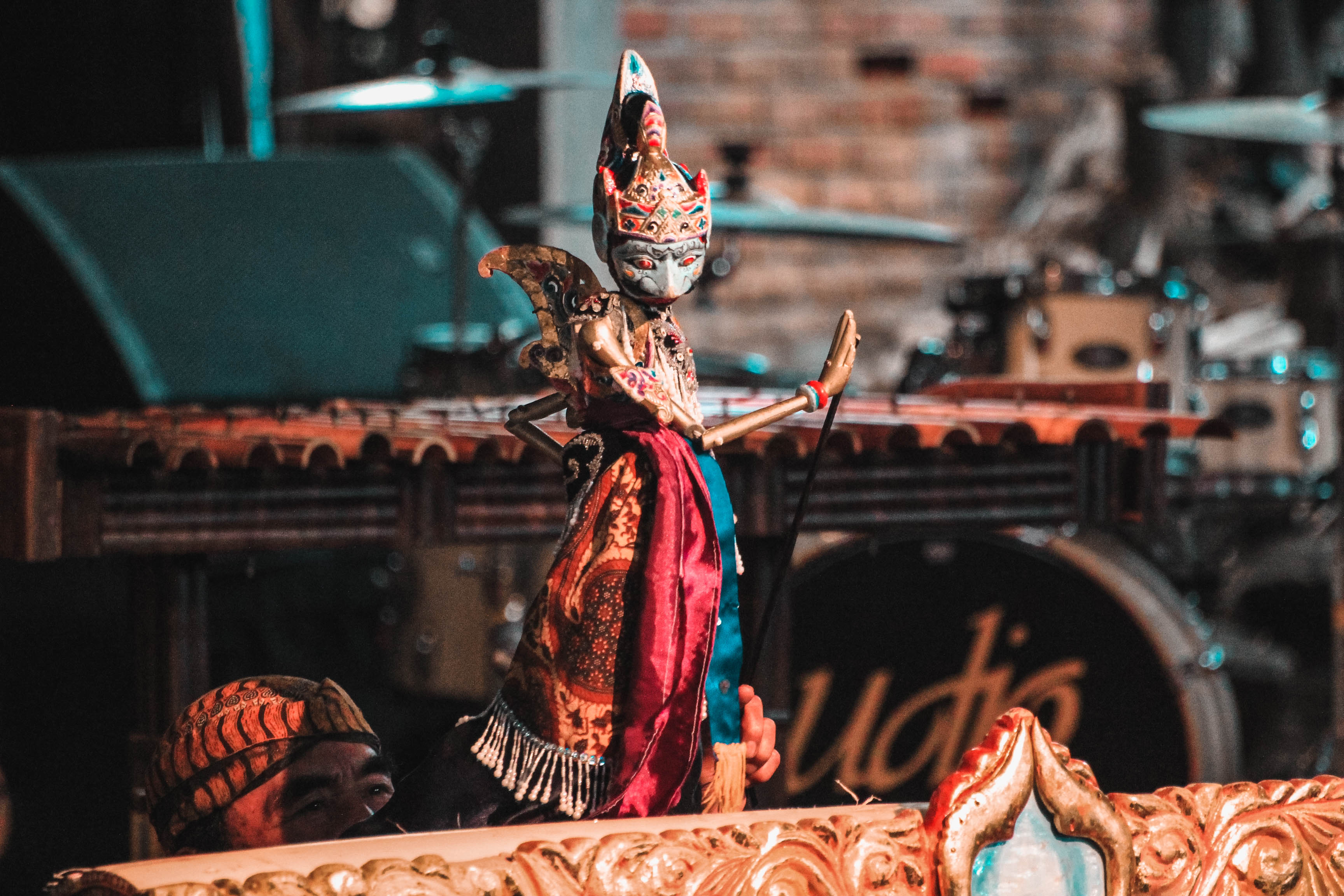
Wayang Golek, a traditional puppet theatre from West Java

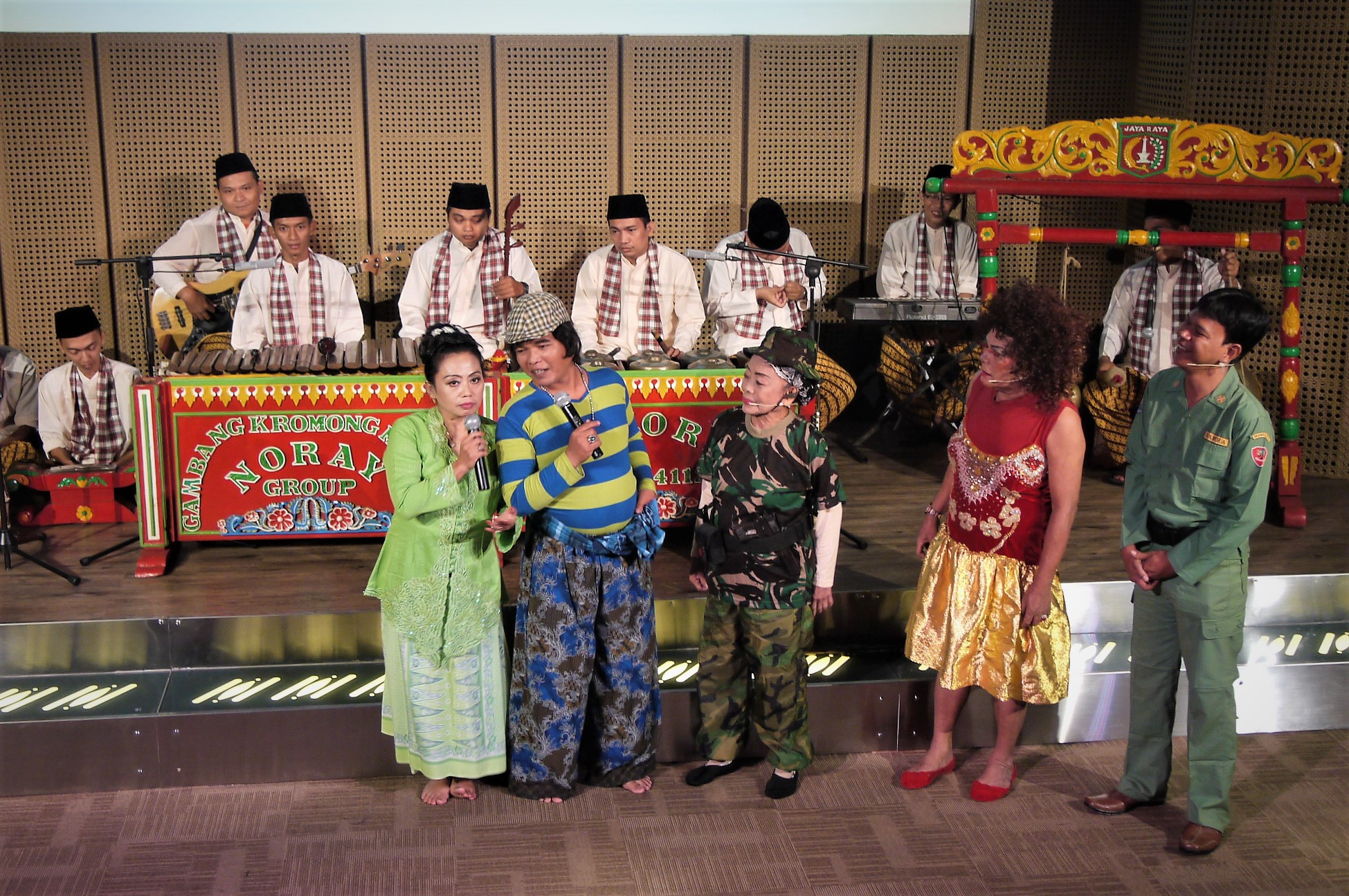
Lenong, a traditional theatrical performance from Jakarta

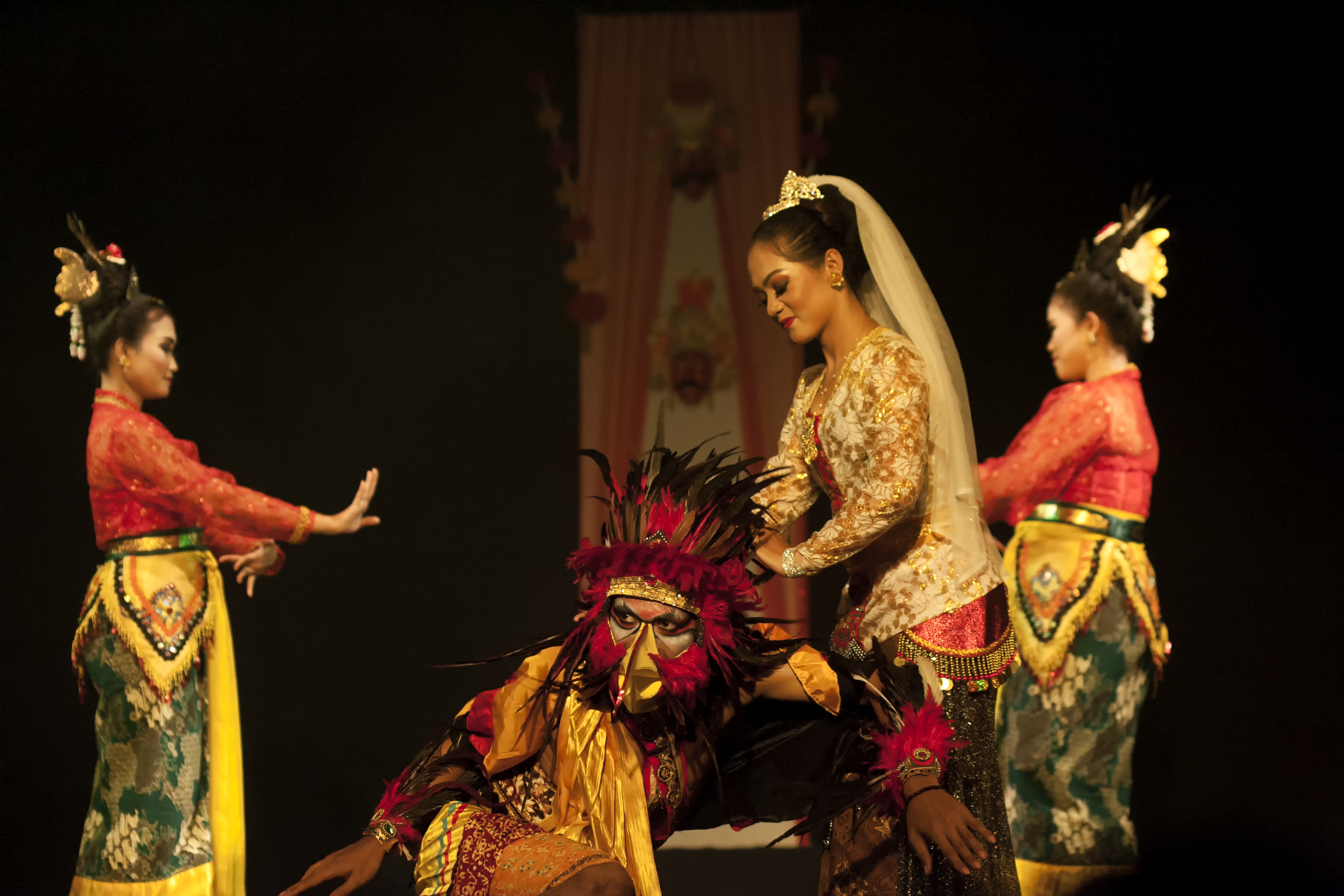
Ketoprak, a traditional theatrical performance from East Java

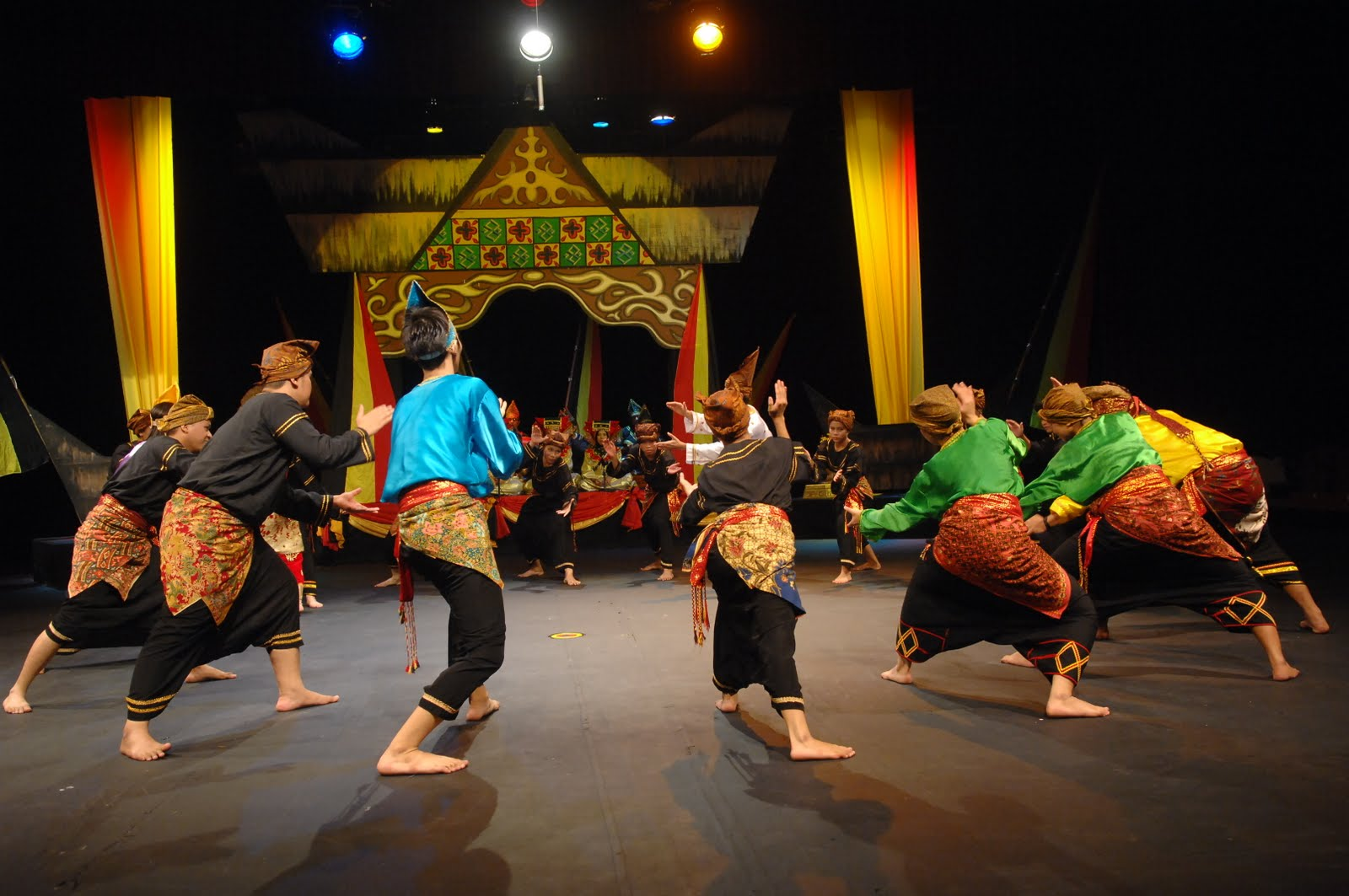
Randai, a traditional Minangkabau performing art from West Sumatra

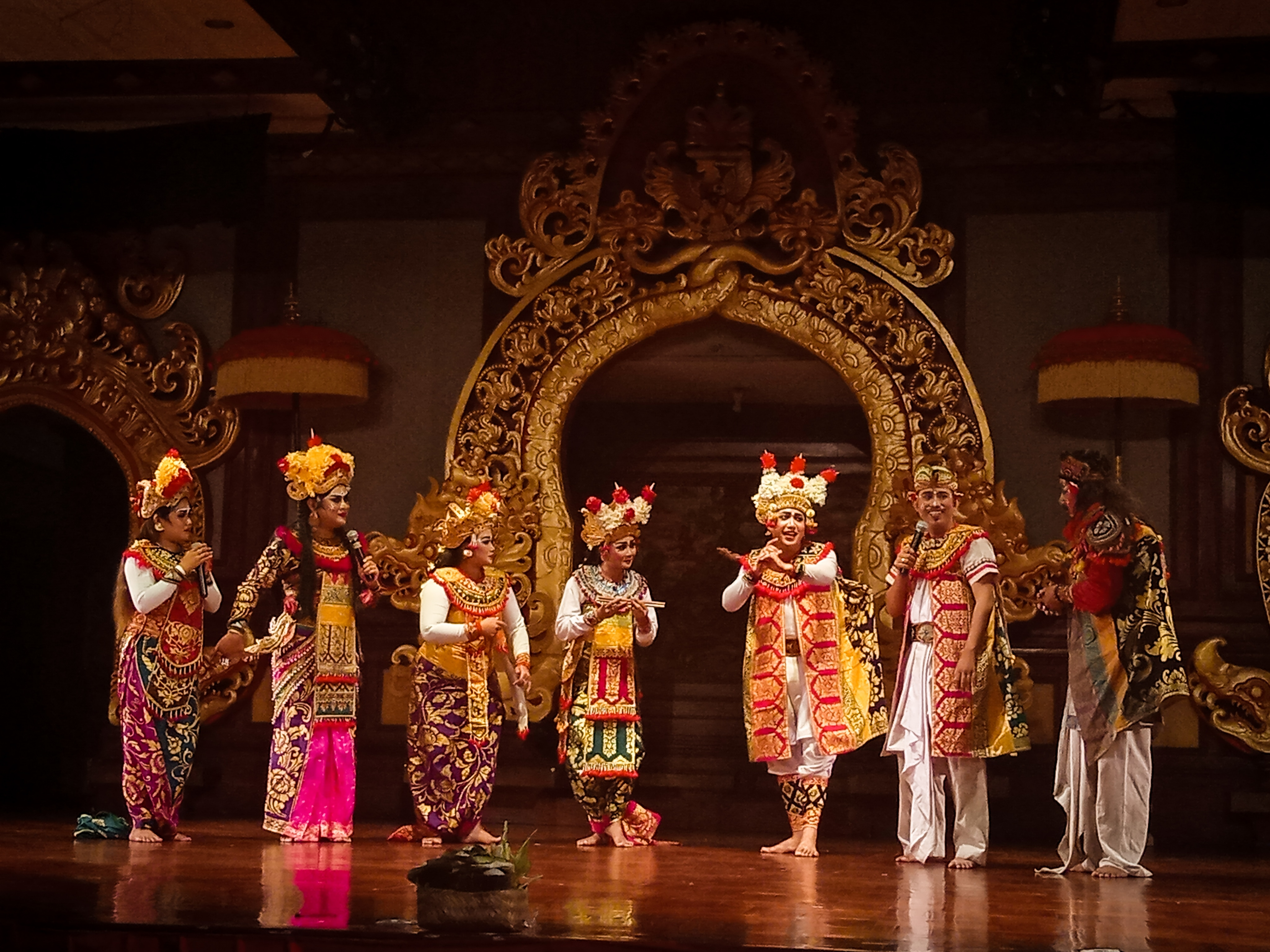
Arja (drama), a traditional Balinese performing art from Bali

=== Martial arts ===
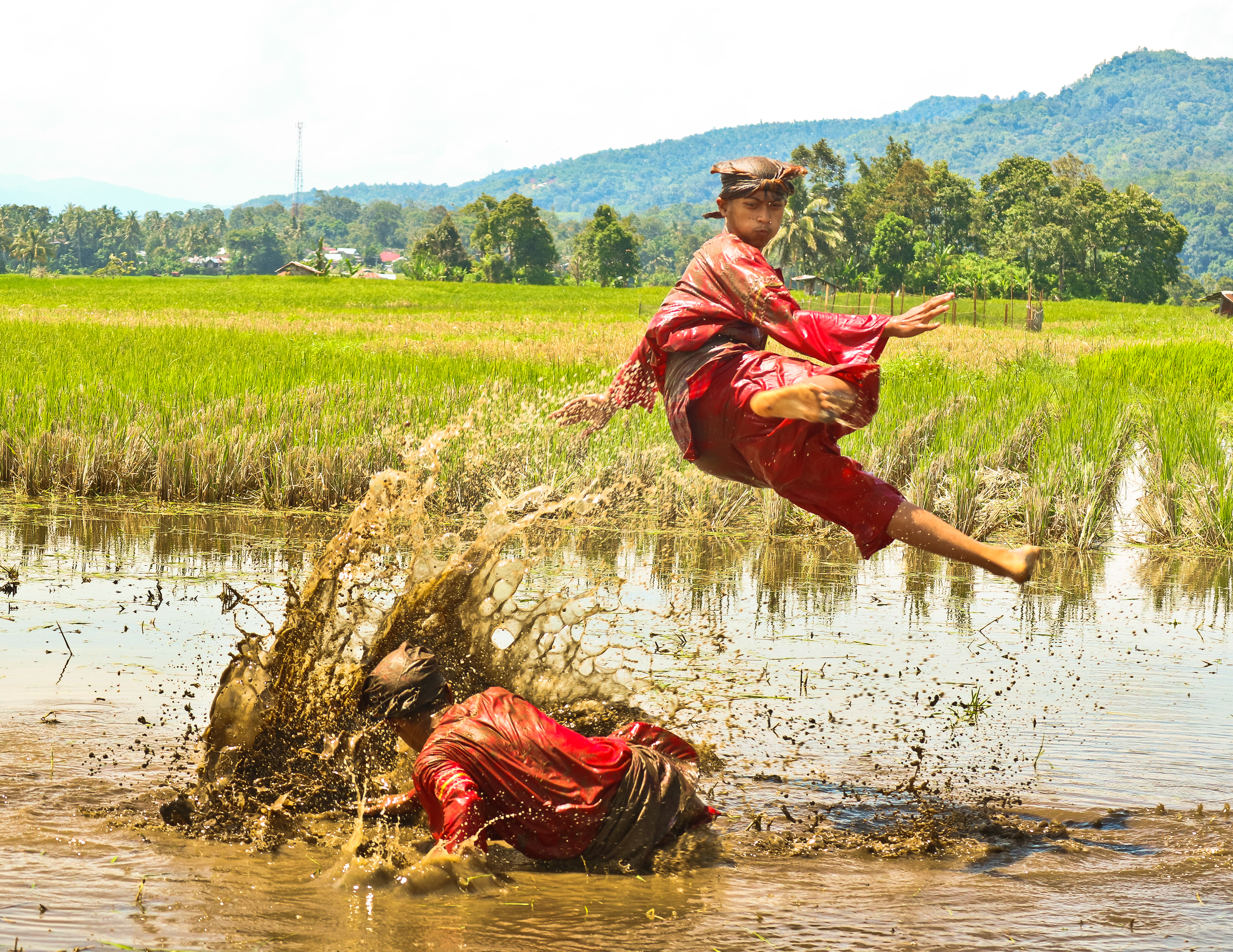
A demonstration of Pencak Silat, a form of martial arts.

Pencak Silat originated and was first developed on the islands of Java and Sumatra. Initially an art of survival, it spread across the Indonesian archipelago and became an integral part of local cultures. Centuries of tribal wars shaped silat into a combat skill used by warriors in ancient Indonesian kingdoms, where it also played a role in determining rank and status.

Over time, influences from Indian and Chinese martial arts further enriched silat. The practice spread outside Indonesia primarily through the diaspora, as people from areas such as Aceh, Minangkabau, Riau, Bugis, Makassar, Javanese, Banjar, migrated to the Malay Peninsula and other islands, passing on their martial traditions to future generations. The Indonesian of half-Dutch descent are also credited as the first to have brought the art into Europe.

Pencak silat was used by Indonesian independence fighters during their struggle against Dutch colonial rule. However, after Indonesia gained independence, pencak silat declined in popularity among Indonesian youth compared to foreign martial arts like Karate and Taekwondo. This decline was partly due to the tradition of teaching pencak silat only within families, rather than openly, as well as the lack of media representation. Efforts have been made to revive interest in silat among Indonesian youth and to promote it internationally. Exhibitions, demonstrations, and state-sponsored initiatives have contributed to its growing recognition, particularly in Europe and the United States. The 2009 Indonesian film Merantau is one example of an effort to introduce pencak silat to the global stage.

Pencak Silat was recognized as a Masterpiece of the Oral and Intangible Heritage of Humanity by UNESCO (United Nations Educational, Scientific and Cultural Organization) on 12 December 2019.

Another martial art from Indonesia is Tarung Derajat. It is a modern combat system created by Haji Ahmad Drajat based on his experience as a street fighter. Tarung Drajat has been acknowledged as a national sport by KONI in 1998 and is now used by Indonesian Army as part of their basic training.

In Eastern Indonesia, a traditional martial art known as Caci involves whip or stick fighting. Originating from Flores in East Nusa Tenggara, Caci is also practiced in Bali and Lombok.

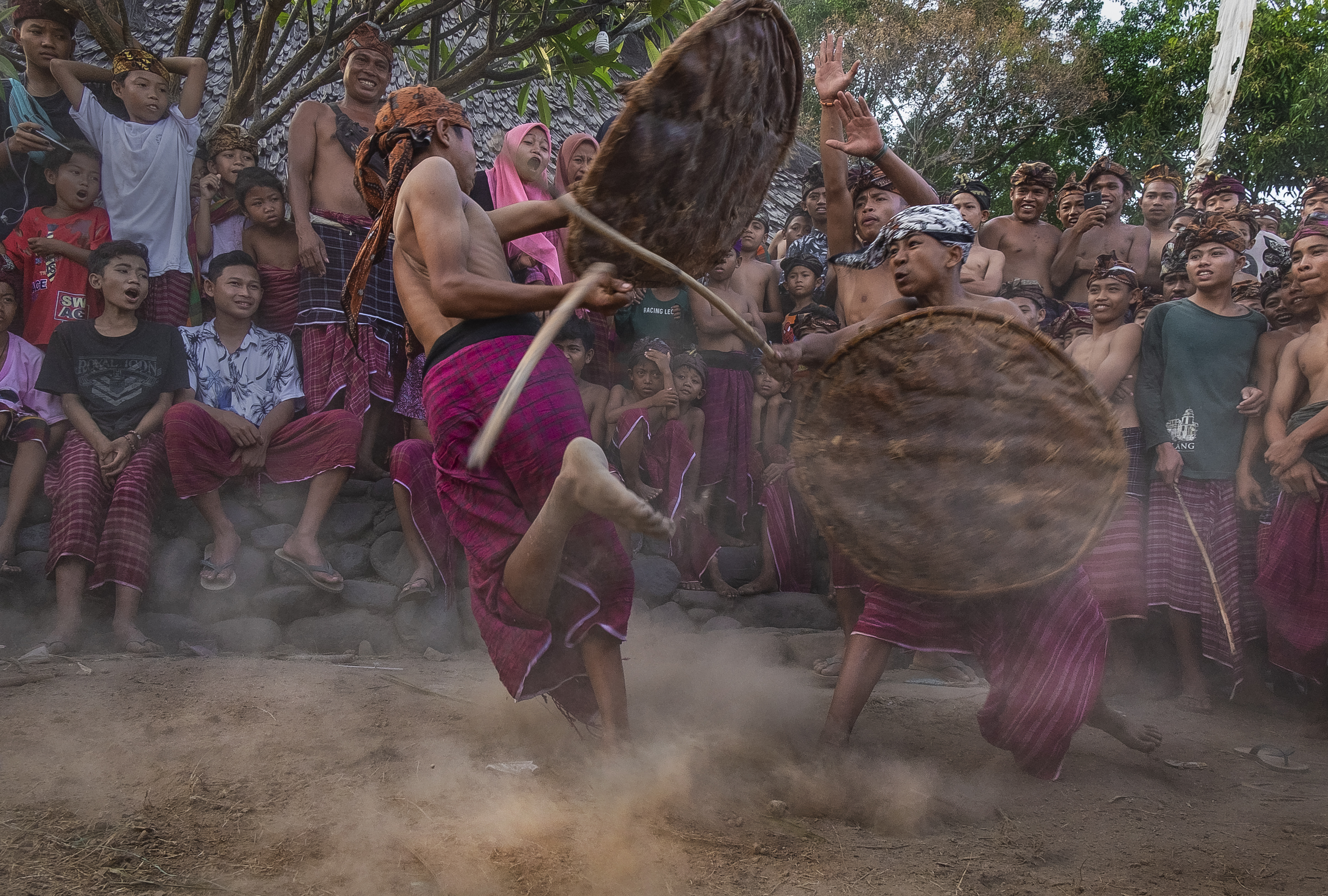
Presean battle in Lombok, West Nusa Tenggara

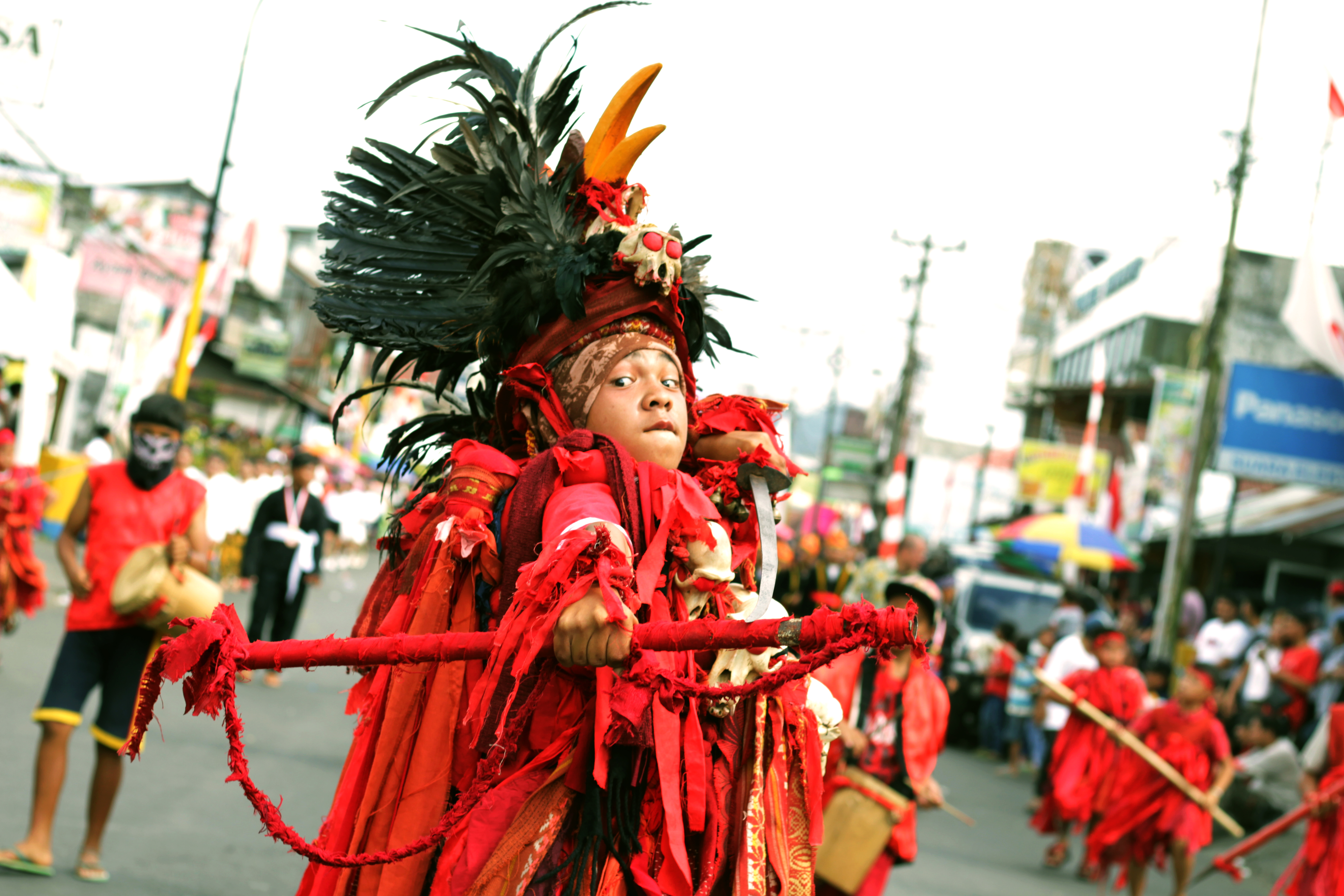
Kabasaran, a traditional martial arts of the Minahasa from North Sulawesi

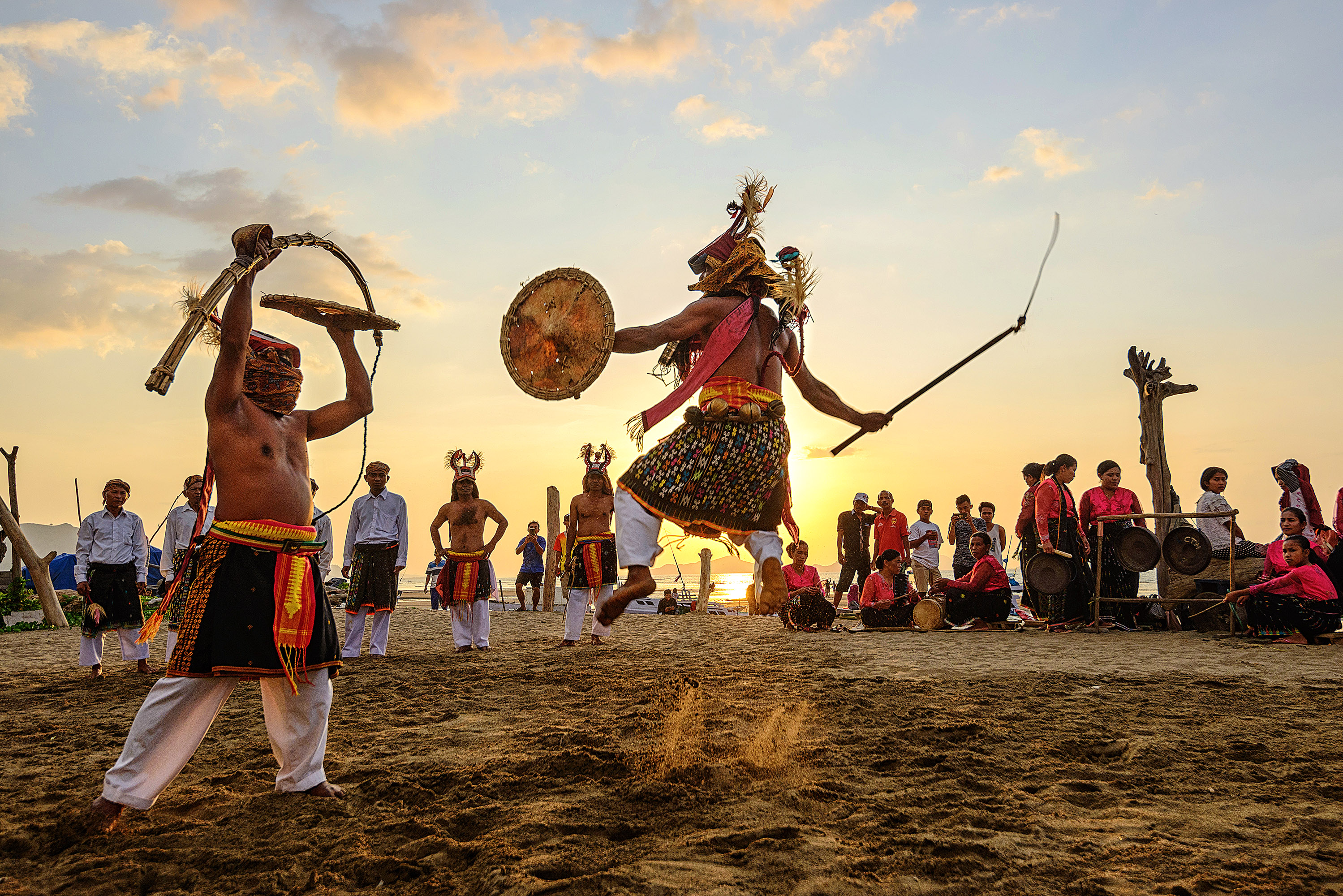
Caci (fighting), a traditional martial arts of the Manggarai community from Flores Island, East Nusa Tenggara

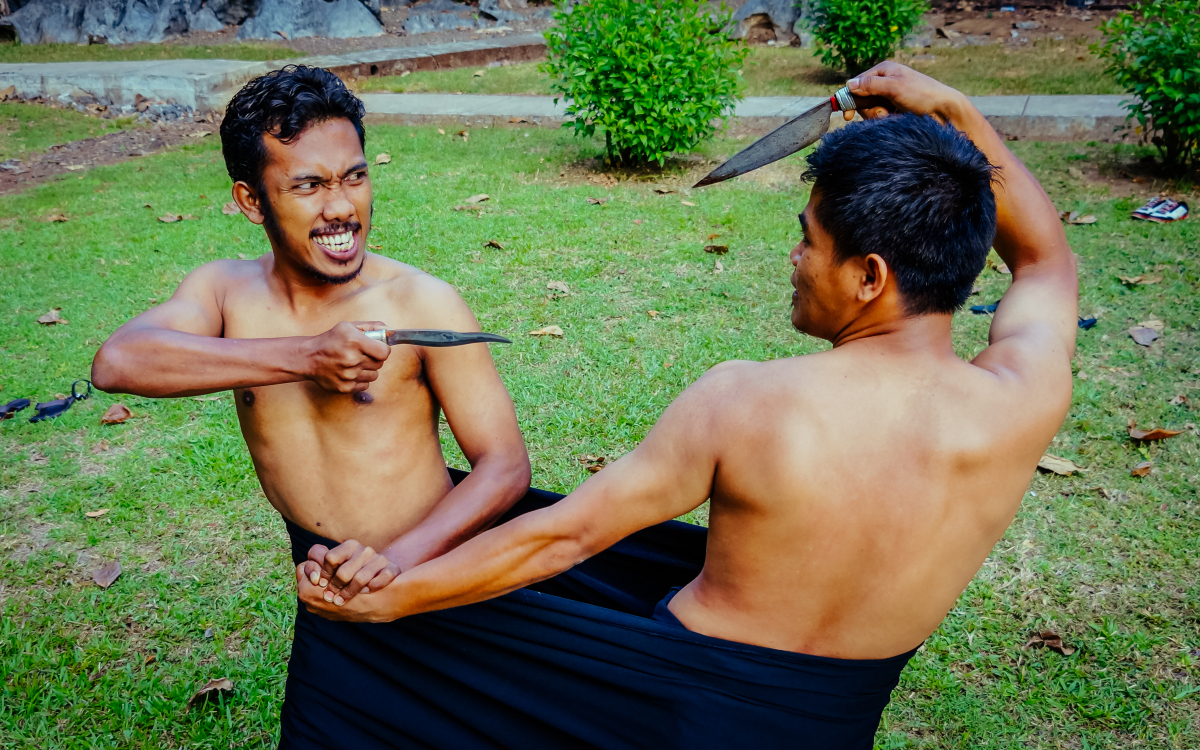
Sitobo lalang lipa or tarung sarong, a duel in a sarong using a badik, is found in Bugis and Makassar cultures

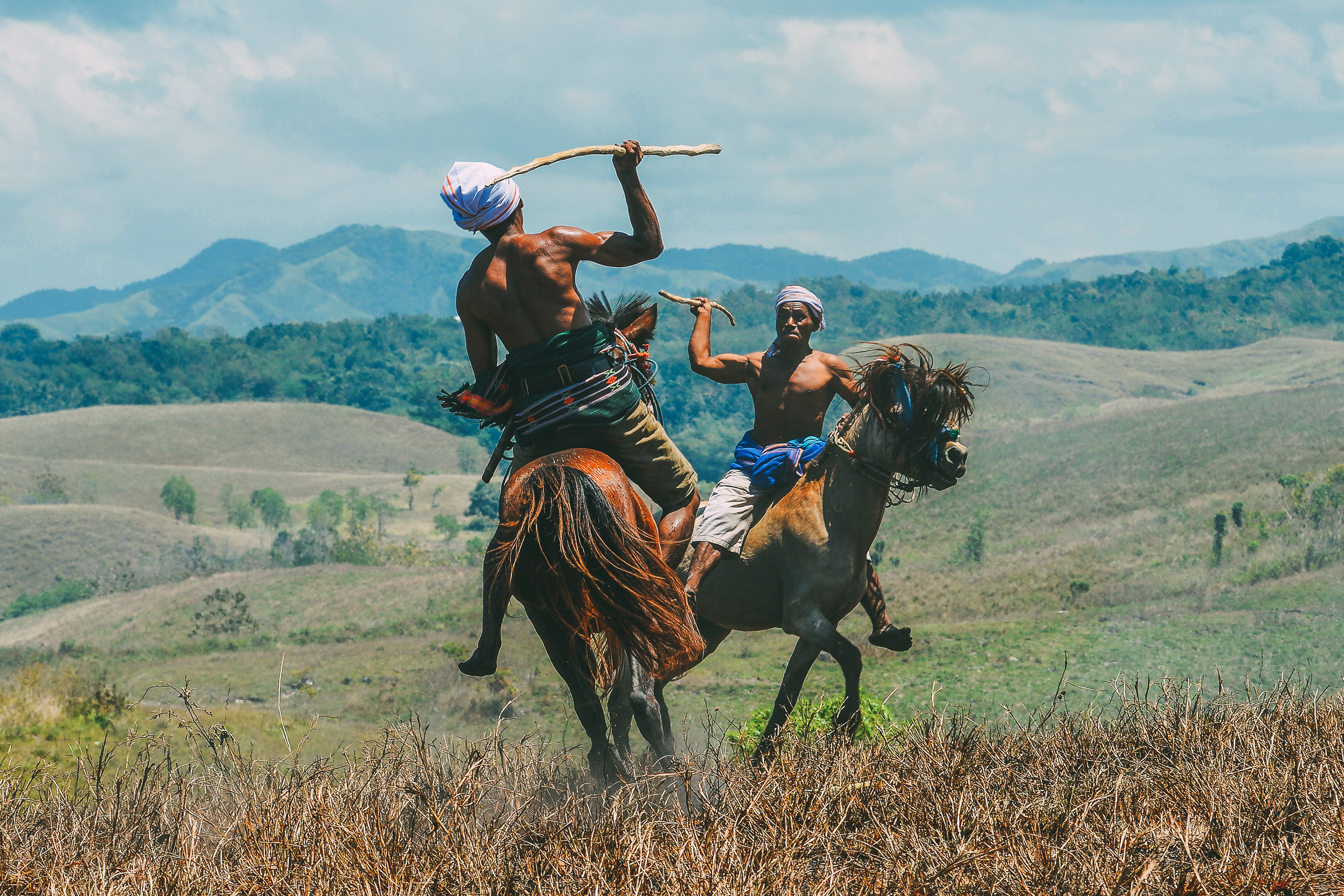
Pasola, a traditional horseback spear-throwing from East Nusa Tenggara

== Traditional visual arts ==
=== Painting ===
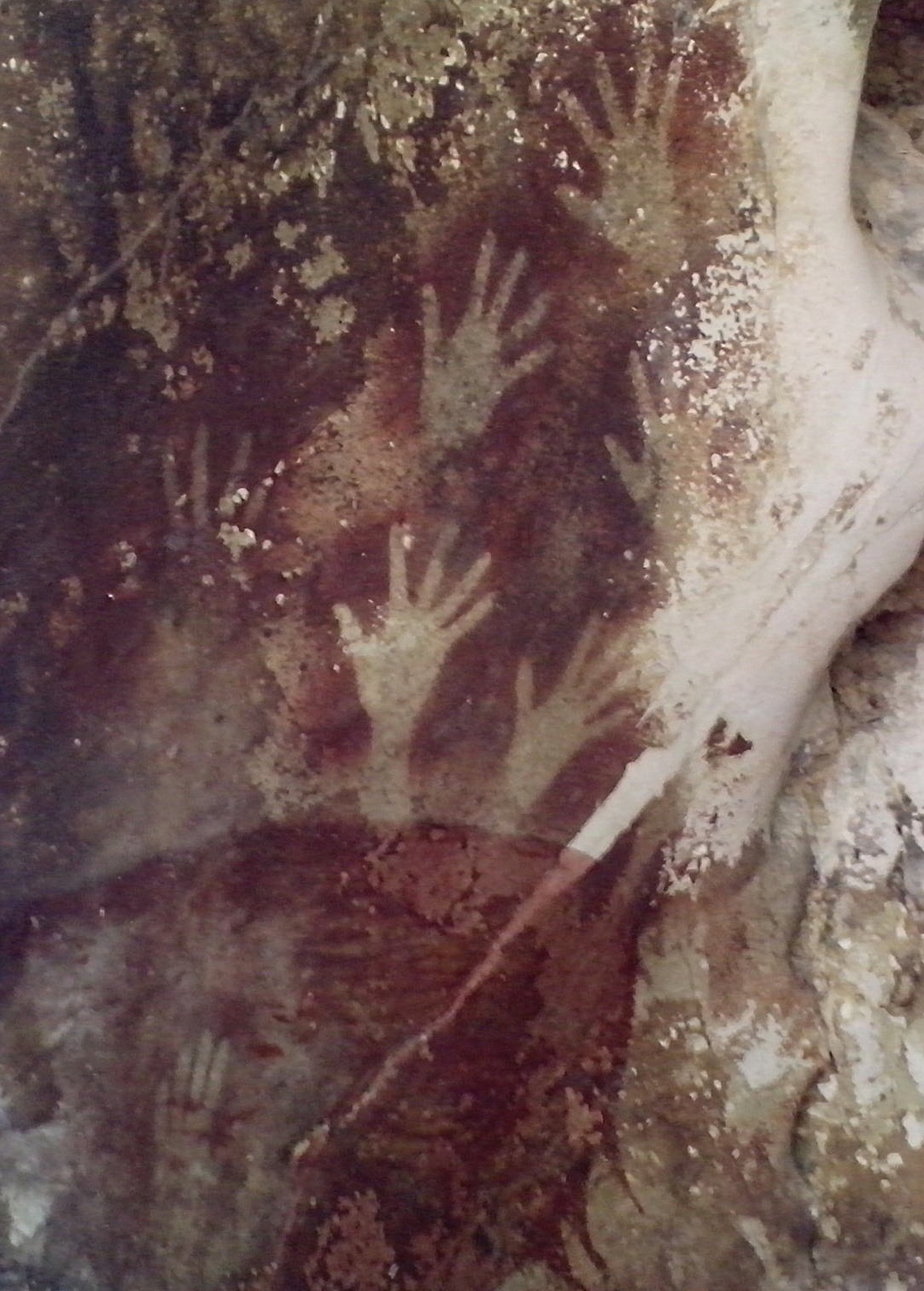
Pettakere Cave "Hand print paintings". The oldest known cave paintings are more than 44,000 years old. Maros, South Sulawesi, Indonesia

The oldest known cave painting in the world, dated to at least 51,200 years ago, was discovered in Karampuang cave, Sulawesi, Indonesia. This painting depicts three human-like figures interacting with a wild boar, making it the earliest known narrative art. Previously, the oldest known figurative paintings were found in Lubang Jeriji Saléh cave, Borneo, estimated to be between 40,000 and 52,000 years old, and in Leang Bulu’ Sipong 4, Sulawesi, which features a hunting scene dated to at least 43,900 years ago. The earliest forms of cave art, including hand stencils and geometric shapes, have also been identified in the Maros Pangkep caves of Sulawesi, dating back over 44,000 years.

Kamasan Palindon Painting detail, an example of Kamasan-style classical painting

Indonesian painting before the 19th century is mostly restricted to the decorative arts, considered to be a religious and spiritual activity, comparable to the pre-1400 European art. Artists' names are anonymous since the individual human creator was seen as far less important than their creation to honour the deities or spirits. Some examples are the Kenyah decorative art, based on endemic natural motifs such as ferns and hornbills, found decorating the walls of Kenyah longhouses. Another notable traditional art is the geometric Toraja wood carvings. Balinese paintings are initially the narrative images to depict scenes of Balinese legends and religious scripts. The classical Balinese paintings are often decorating the lontar manuscripts and also the ceilings of temples pavilion.

Under the influence of the Dutch colonial power, a trend toward Western-style painting emerged in the 19th century. In the Netherlands, the term "Indonesian Painting" is applied to the paintings produced by Dutch or other foreign artists who lived and worked in the former Netherlands-Indies. The most famous indigenous 19th-century Indonesian painter is Raden Saleh (1807–1877), the first indigenous artist to study in Europe. His art is heavily influenced by Romanticism. In the 1920s Walter Spies settled in Bali, he is often credited with attracting the attention of Western cultural figures to Balinese culture and art. His works have somehow influenced Balinese artists and painters. Today Bali has one of the most vivid and richest painting traditions in Indonesia.

The 1920s to 1940s were a time of growing nationalism in Indonesia. The previous period of the romanticism movement was not seen as a purely Indonesian movement and did not develop. Painters began to see the natural world for inspiration. Some examples of Indonesian painter during this period are the Balinese Ida Bagus Made and the realist Basuki Abdullah. The Indonesian Painters Association (Persatuan Ahli-Ahli Gambar Indonesia or PERSAGI, 1938–1942) was formed during this period. PERSAGI established a contemporary art philosophy that saw artworks as reflections of the artist's individual or personal view as well as an expression of national cultural thoughts.

Some examples of Indonesian painting

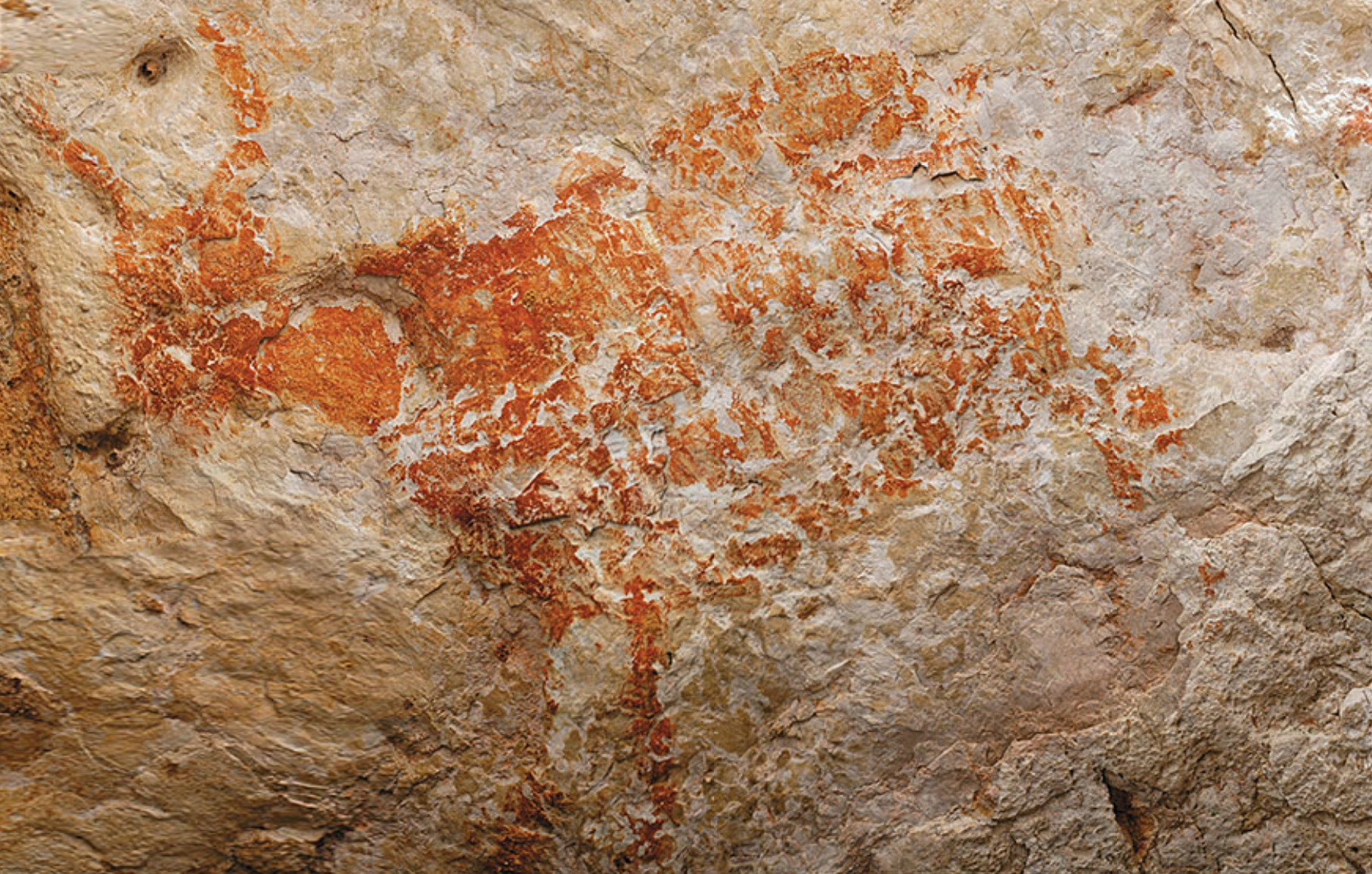
Lubang Jeriji Saléh cave, one of the oldest known figurative paintings in the world

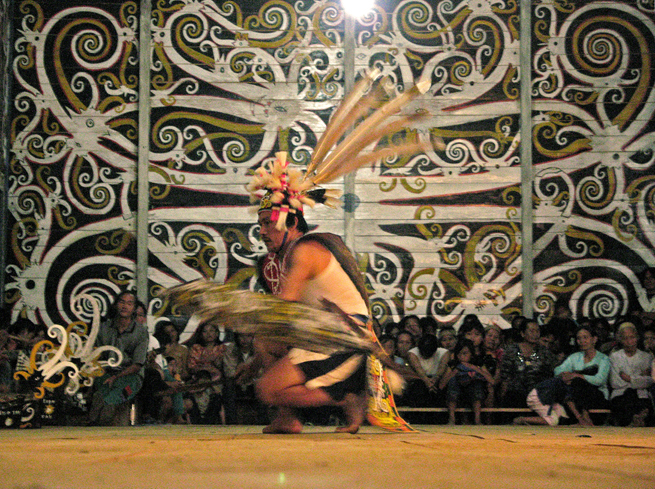
Kenyah mural painting from Kalimantan

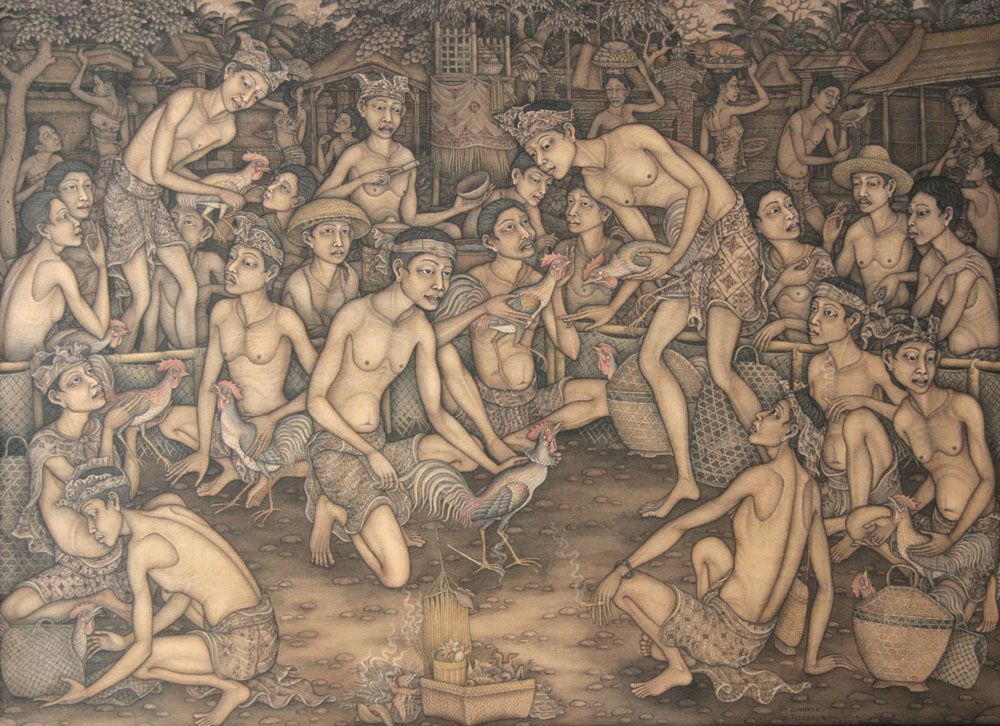
Traditional Balinese painting depicting cockfighting

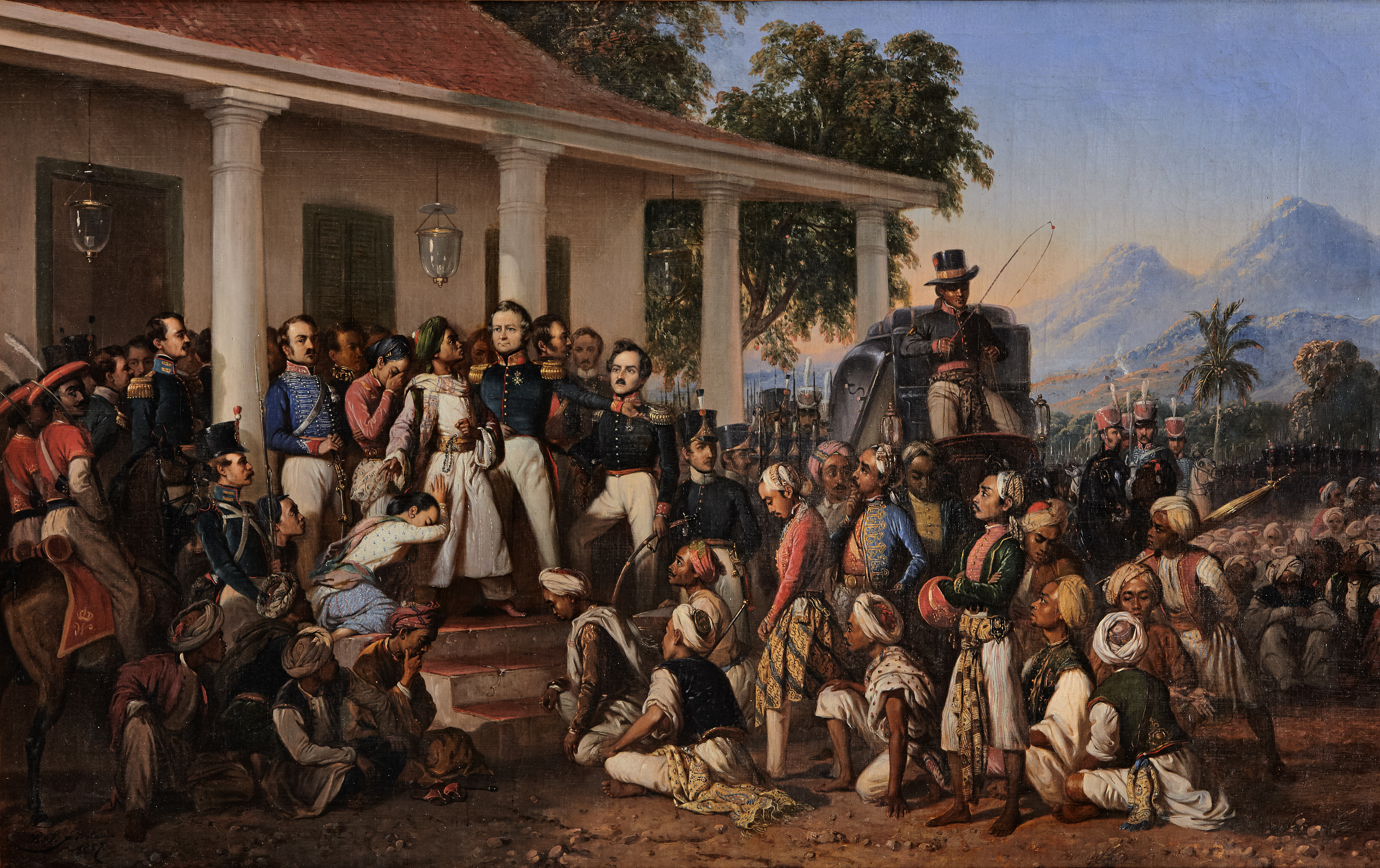
The Arrest of Pangeran Diponegoro, Raden Saleh (1857)

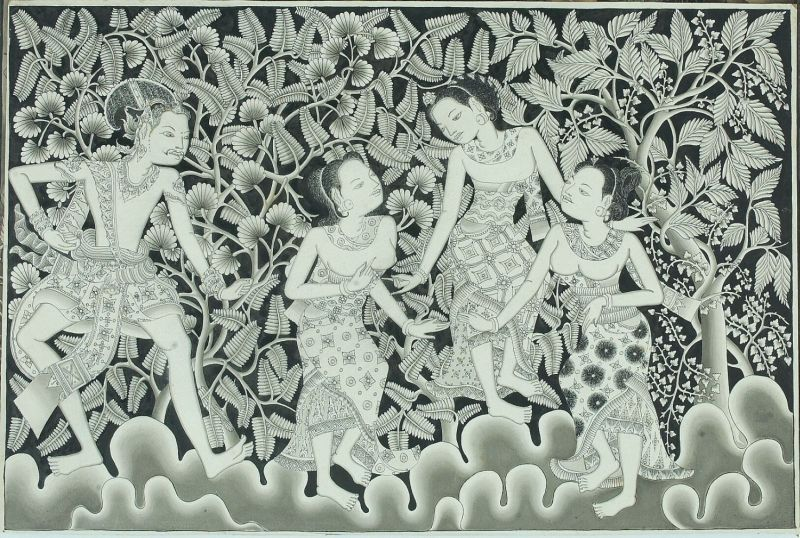
Modern painting of Prince Panji of Java meeting three women in the jungle

=== Wood carvings ===
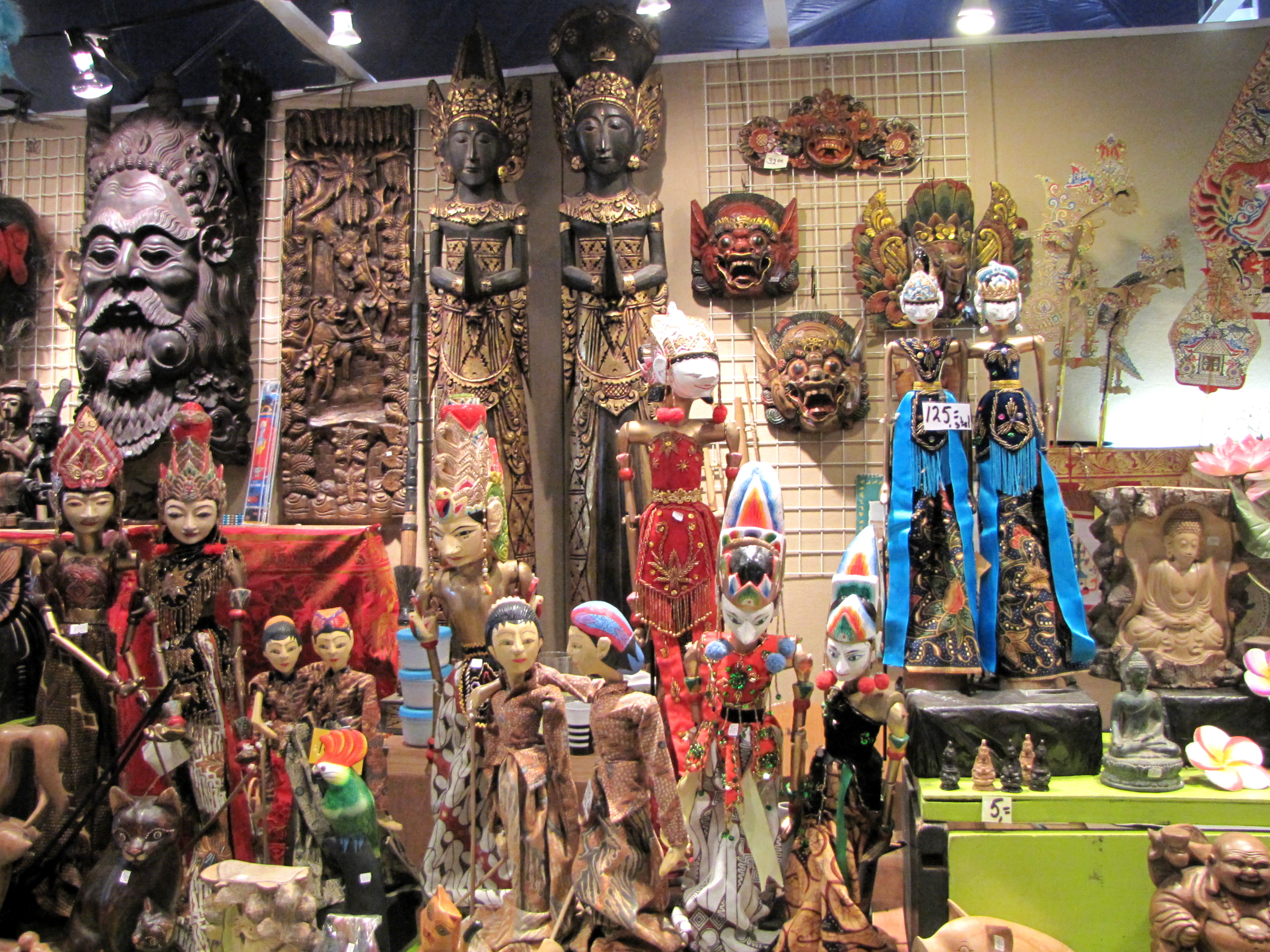
Indonesian wood carving

The art of wood carving is quite well-developed in Indonesia. Other than tribal art woodcarvings of Asmat, Batak, Dayak, Nias, and Toraja area is well known for its refined wood carving culture; they are Jepara in Central Java and Bali. Mas village near Ubud in Bali is renowned for its wood carving art. Balinese woodcarving today has a sustained tourist market in Bali.

In South Papua, Asmat art consists of elaborate stylized wood carvings such as the bisj pole and is designed to honour ancestors. Many Asmat artefacts have been collected by the world's museums, among the most notable of which are those found in the Michael C. Rockefeller Collection at the Metropolitan Museum of Art in New York City and the Tropenmuseum in Amsterdam. Bisj poles are carved by Asmat religious carvers (wow-ipits) after a member of their tribe or community had been killed and headhunted by an enemy tribe. Carved out of a single piece of a wild mangrove tree, Bisj poles can reach heights of up to 25 feet (7.62 m). Their carvings depict human figures standing on top of each other, as well as animal figures, phallic symbols, and carvings in the shape of a canoe prow. The Asmat participated in headhunting raids and cannibalism as rituals, many rituals involved the Bisj poles, including dancing, masquerading, singing and headhunting—all performed by men.

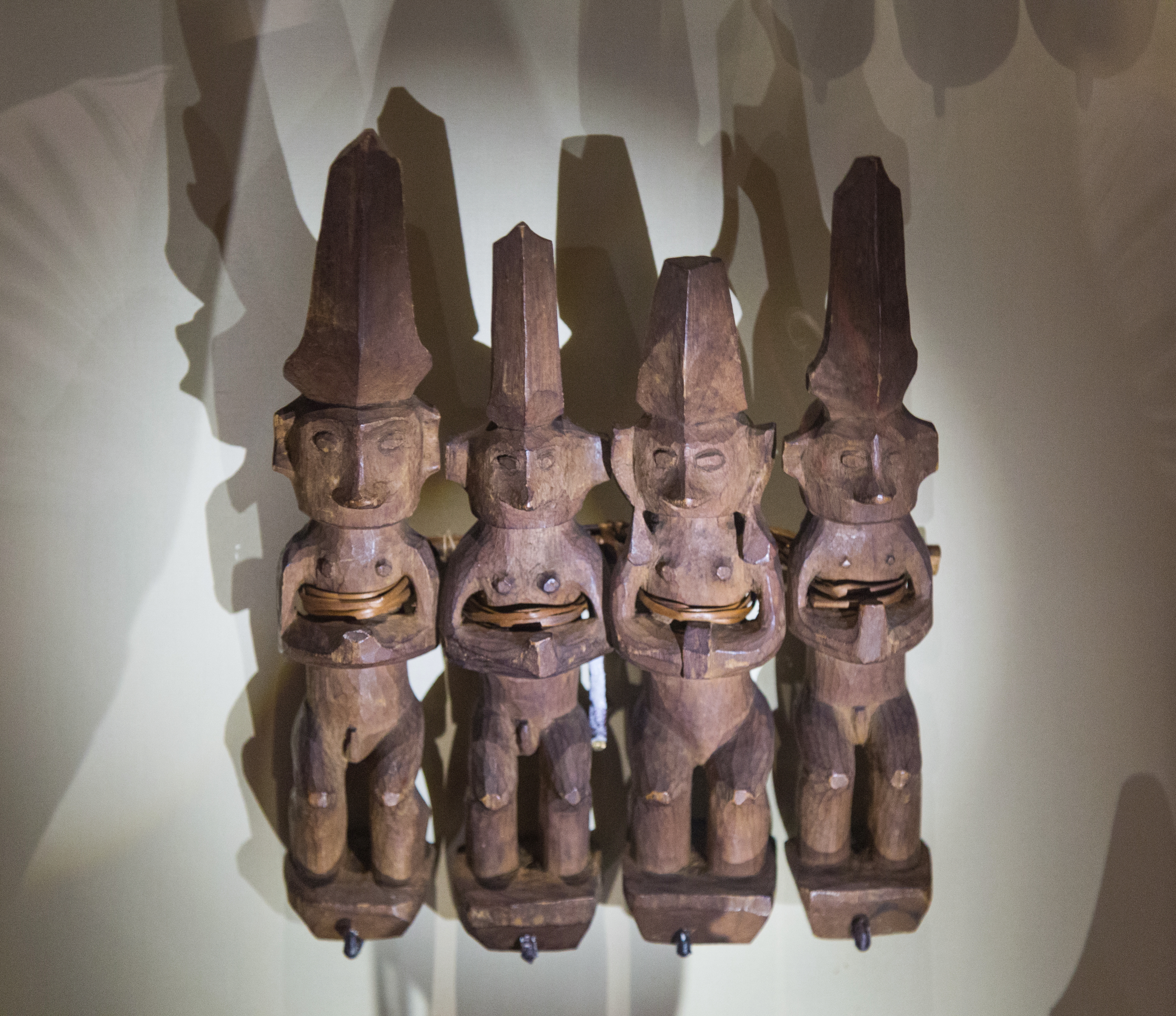
The Nias adu zatua (wooden ancestor statues)

In North Sumatra, the people of Nias placed great value on wooden figures or adu. The sole purpose of the Nias figures was to fulfil ritual needs, whether it is to ensure wealth or to perform specific beneficial rite. Niassan figures vary in size, from as small as 20 centimetres (7.9 in) in height to more than 2 metres (6.6 ft) tall. When an elderly person died, the family would make a wooden statue known as adu zatua. The statue was unveiled on the fourth day after the death of the person. The shape of the wooden statue reflects the status of the person who used them: the more powerful the owner, the more impressive the statue will be made. Nias people believed that the deceased person's spirits reside in the statue, so all events that occurred in the family were shared with the ancestor statues through prayers. Ancestor statues were placed in the main room of the house, sometimes more than a hundred. A missionary work in 1930 had recorded the removal of 'over 2000 "idols" from a house of new northern convert.' Some missionaries even recorded houses collapsing under the weight of these ancestor figures. Small adu zatua were bound together horizontally using a rattan and pegs.

Many ancestor figures were destroyed in 1916 by Christian missionary movements which saw them as an old blasphemous religious symbol. Some were sold to collectors and can be found in museum or private collections around the world.

In Sulawesi, Torajans carve wood, calling it Pa'ssura (or "the writing"). One of the Toraja wood carvings is Tau tau, Tau tau is a kind of human statue made of wood or bamboo. Torajans believe that the dead can take their possessions with them to the afterlife, the effigies are usually equipped with small possessions. Traditionally, the effigies were simply carved, only to show the gender of the deceased. However, they have become more and more elaborate, actually attempting to imitate the likeness of the deceased. Nowadays, Tau tau has a photographic likeness to the people they represent.

Some examples of Indonesian wood carving for rituals

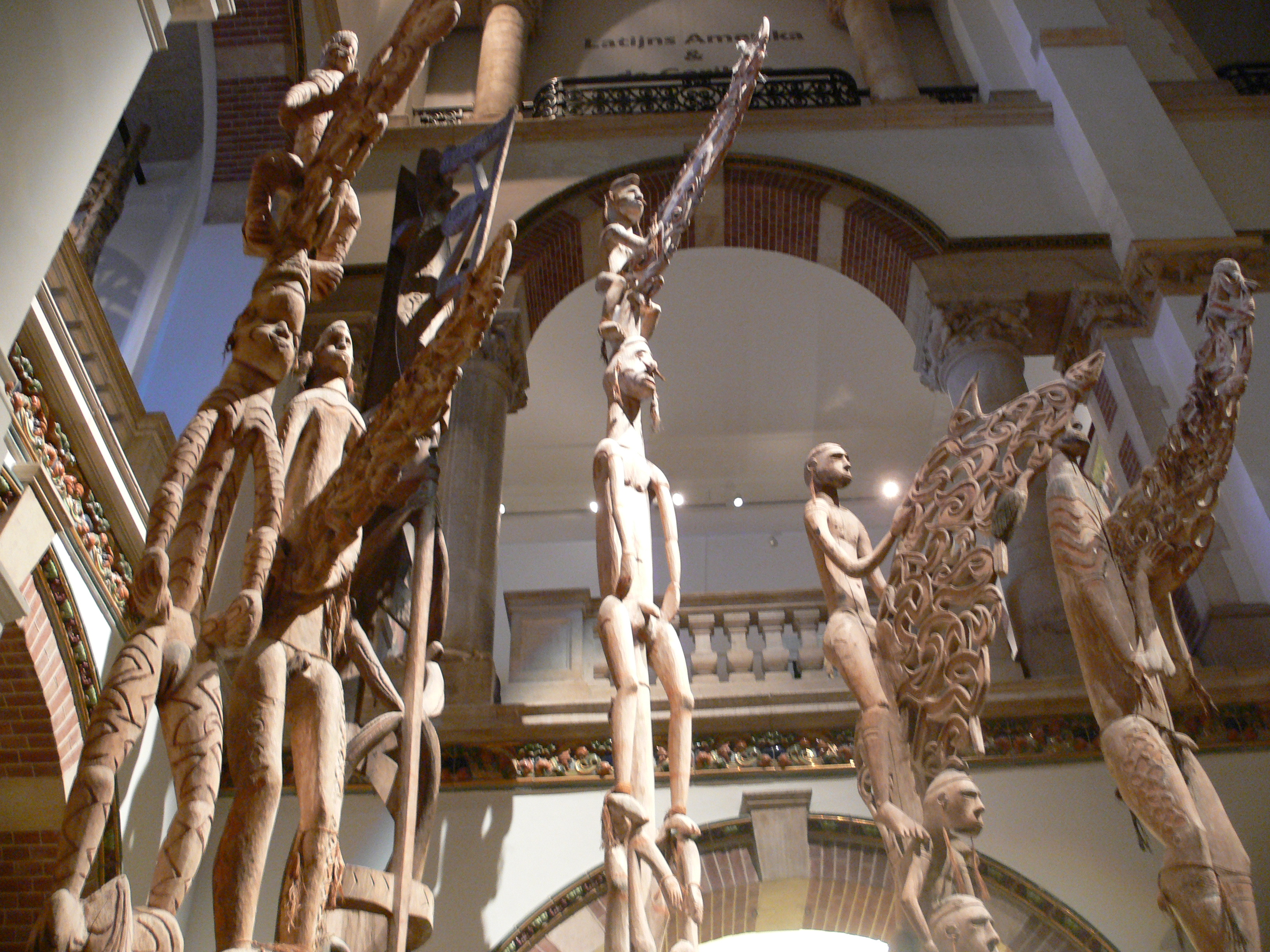
Bisj pole, wooden funerary poles from Papua

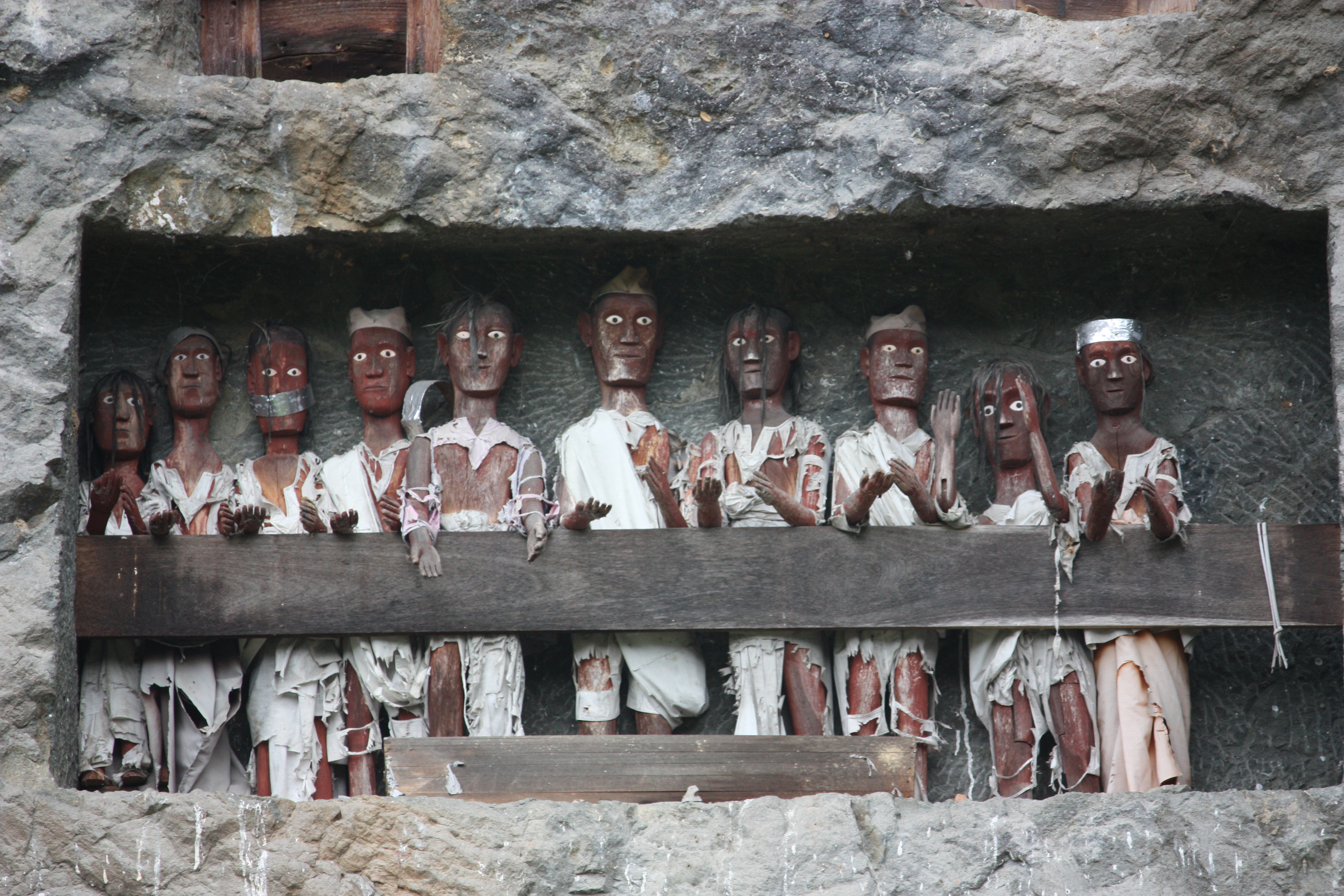
Toraja stone-carved burial site. Tau tau (wooden statue of the deceased) were put in the cave, looking out over the land, from South Sulawesi

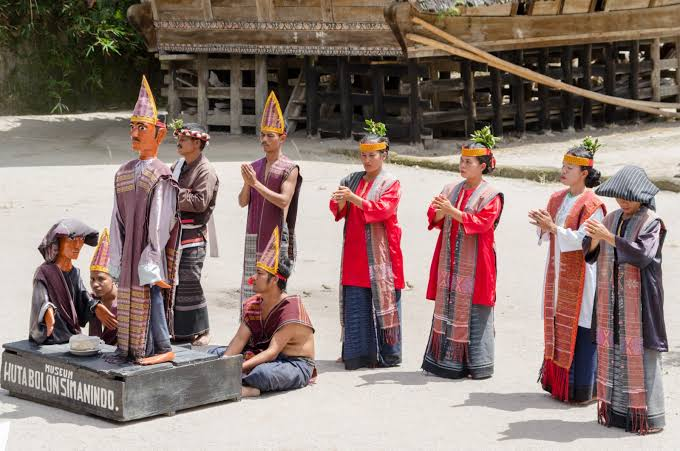
Sigale Gale of Batak people from North Sumatra

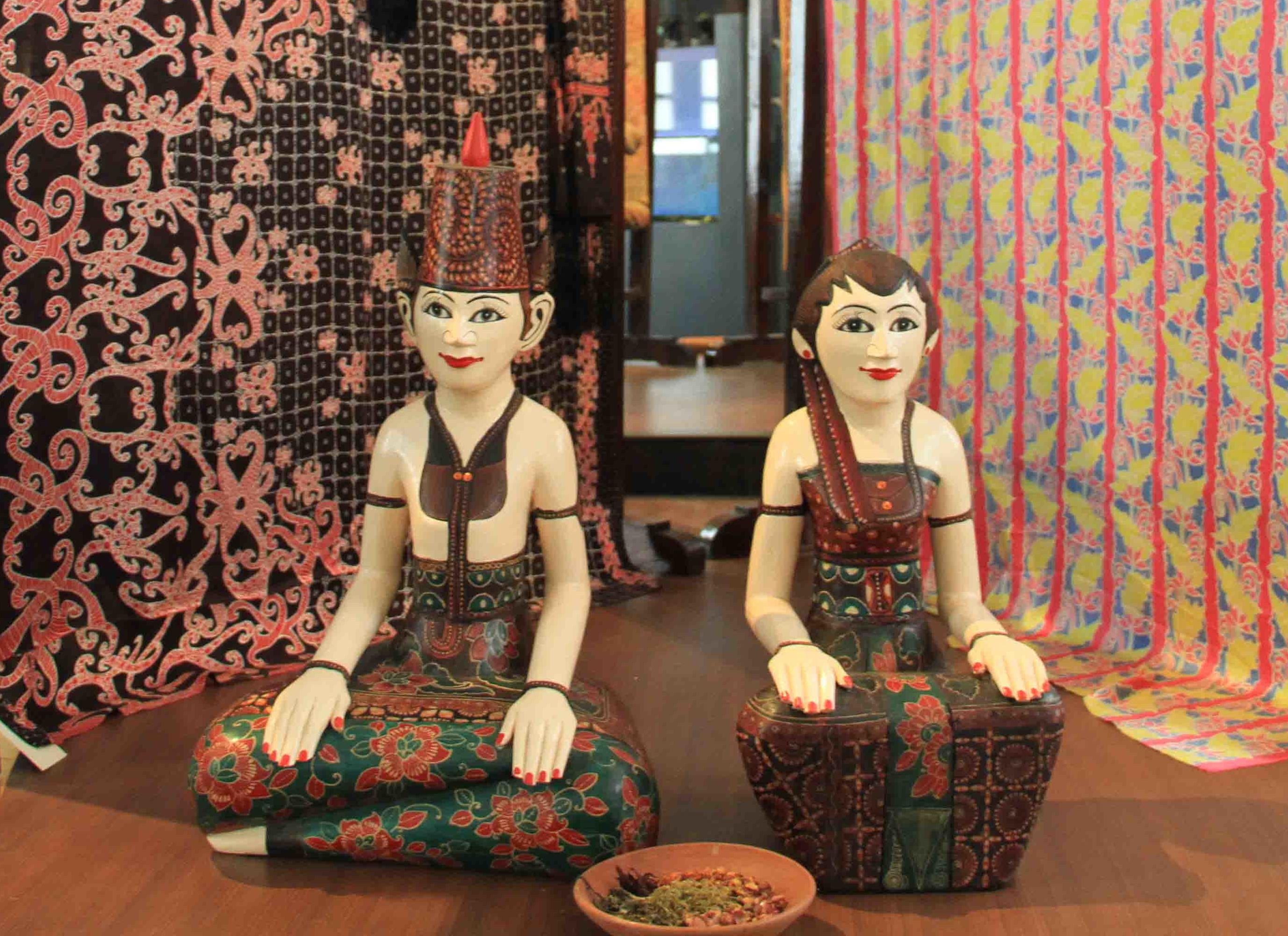
A Pair of Loro Blonyo from Java

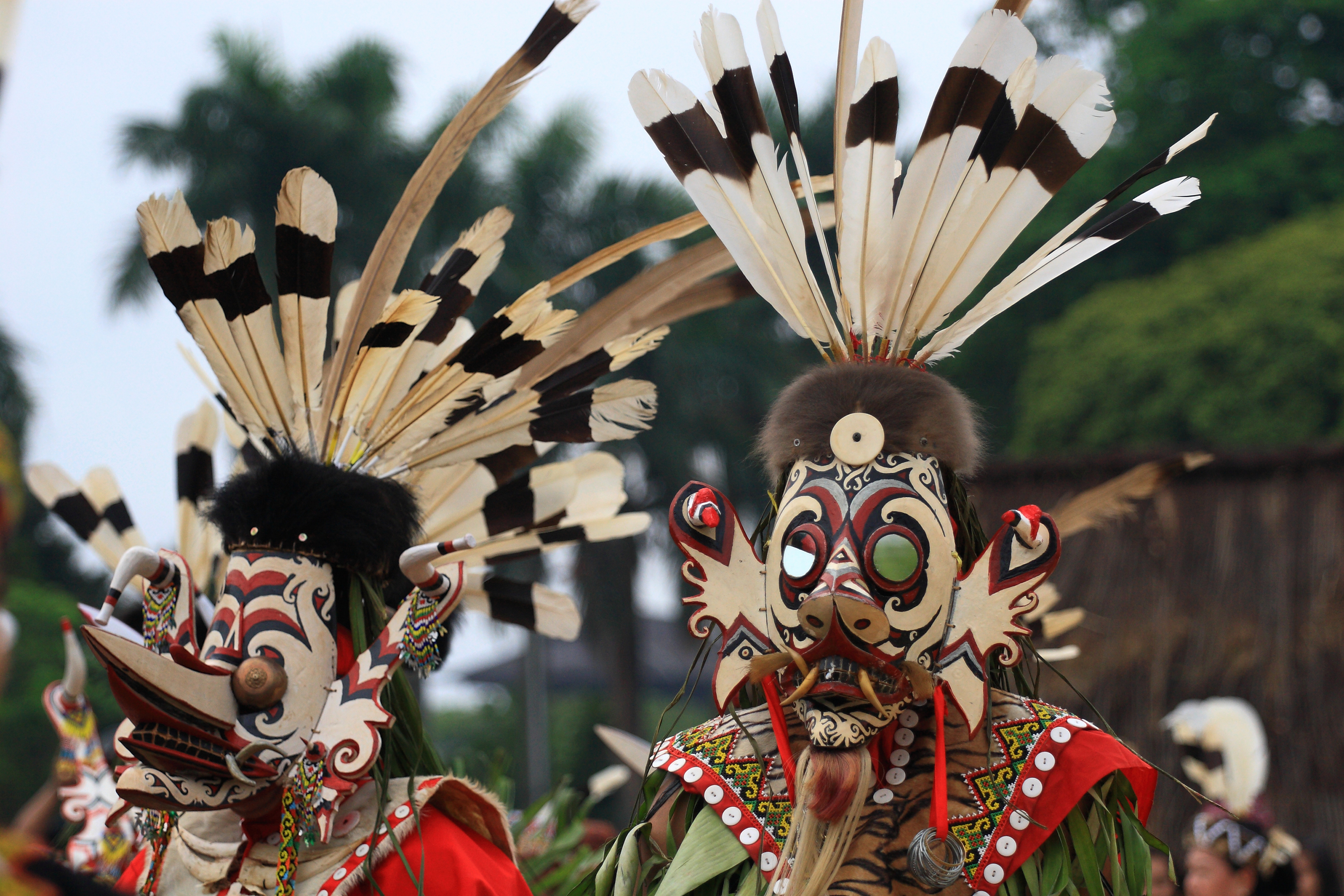
Hudoq wooden mask from East Kalimantan.

=== Sculpture ===
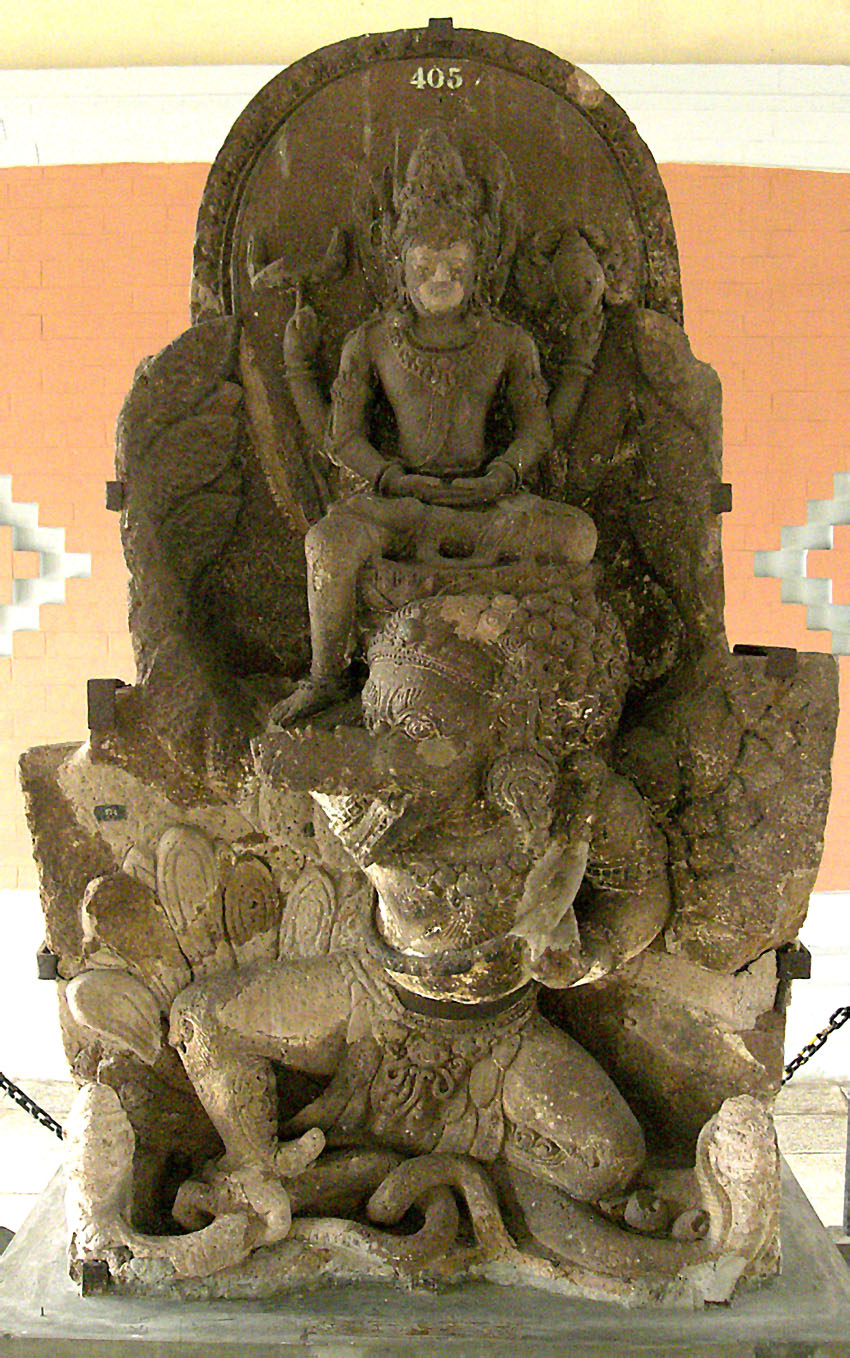
The deified statue of King Airlangga depicted as Vishnu mounting Garuda, found in Java

Indonesia has a long history of stone, bronze and Iron Ages arts. Indonesia has a rich history of Hindu–Buddhist sculpture and architecture that has been shaped by a complex fusion of local, indigenous culture combined with foreign customs. Some Indonesian artifacts made from gold and bronze dating back to the 10th century are exhibited in the US. The megalithic sculptures can be found in numerous archaeological sites in Sumatra, Java to Sulawesi. The native Indonesians tribes have their own distinct tribal sculpture styles, usually created to depict ancestors, deities and animals. The stone sculpture artform particularly flourished in 8th-to-10th-century Java and Bali, which demonstrate the influences of Hindu-Buddhist culture, both as stand-alone works of art and also incorporated into temples. The most notable sculpture of the classical Hindu-Buddhist era of Indonesia are the hundreds of meters of relief and hundreds of stone buddhas at the temple of Borobudur in central Java. Approximately two miles of exquisite relief sculpture tell the story of the life of Buddha and illustrate his teachings. The temple was originally home to 504 statues of the seated Buddha.

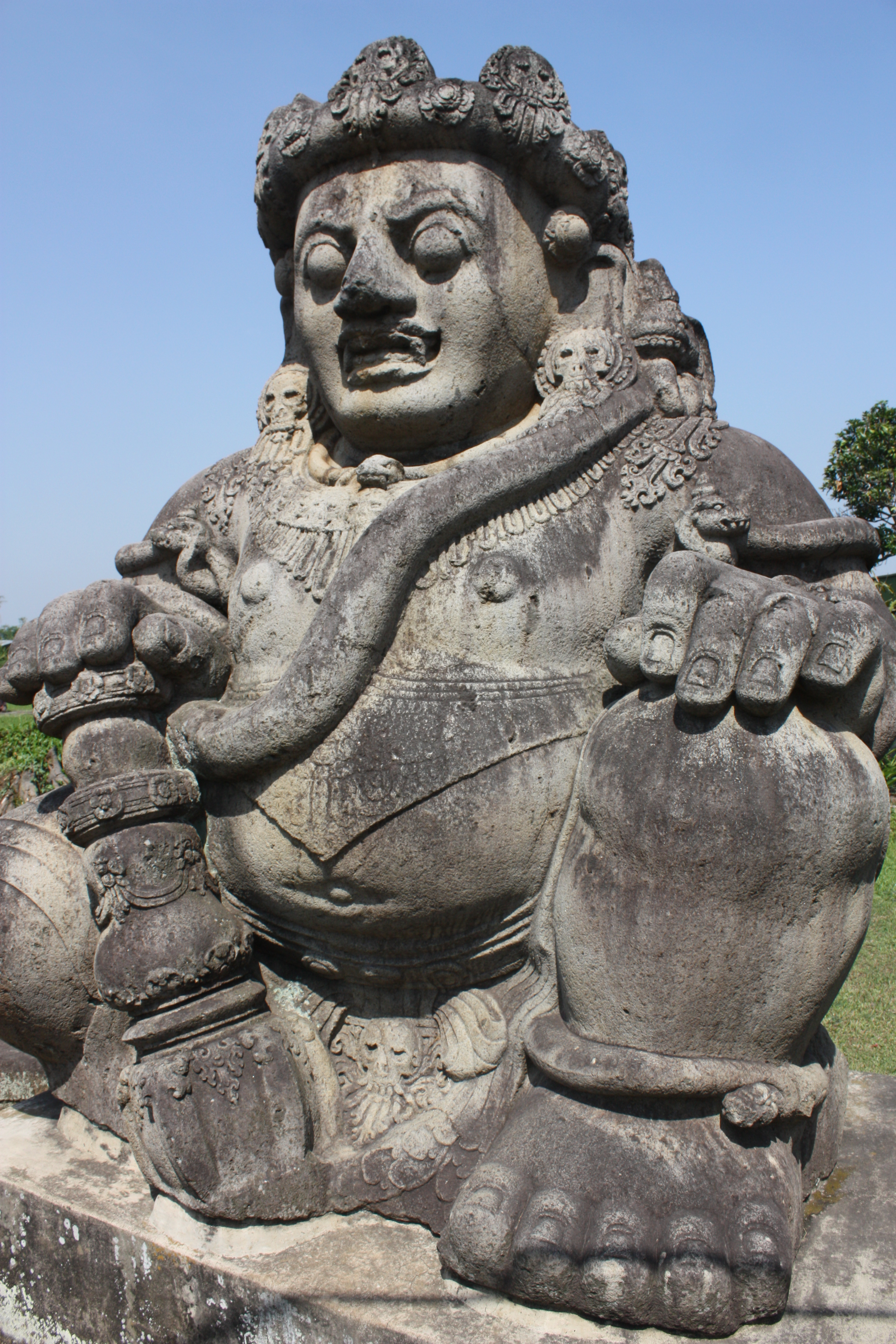
Dwarapala Statue is a door or gate guardian, usually armed with a weapon, Malang, East Java

The examples of notable Indonesian Hindu-Buddhist sculptures are; the statues of Hindu deities; Shiva, Vishnu, Brahma, Durga, Ganesha and Agastya enthroned in rooms of Prambanan temples, the Vishnu mounting Garuda statue of king Airlangga, the exquisite statue of Eastern Javanese Prajnaparamita and 3.7 meters tall Dvarapala dated from Singhasari period, and also the grand statue of Bhairava Adityawarman discovered in Sumatra. Today, the Hindu-Buddhist style stone sculptures are reproduced in villages in Muntilan near Borobudur also in Trowulan the former capital site of Majapahit in East Java, and Bali, and sold as a garden or pool ornament statues for homes, offices and hotels.

The walls of candi also often displayed bas-reliefs, either serve as decorative elements as well as to convey religious symbolic meanings; through describing narrative bas-reliefs. The most exquisite of the temple bas-reliefs can be found in Hindu and Buddhist temples. The first four terraces of Borobudur walls are showcases for bas-relief sculptures. These are exquisite, considered to be the most elegant and graceful in the ancient Buddhist world. The Buddhist scriptures describes as bas-reliefs in Borobudur such as Karmavibhangga (the law of karma), Lalitavistara (the birth of Buddha), Jataka, Avadana and Gandavyuha. While in Prambanan the Hindu scriptures is describes in its bas-relief panels; the Ramayana and Bhagavata Purana (popularly known as Krishnayana).

The bas-reliefs in Borobudur depicted many scenes of daily life in 8th-century ancient Java, from the courtly palace life, hermit in the forest, to those of commoners in the village. It also depicted a temple, marketplace, various flora and fauna, and also native vernacular architecture. People depicted here are the images of king, queen, princes, noblemen, courtier, soldier, servant, commoners, priest and hermit. The reliefs also depicted mythical spiritual beings in Buddhist beliefs such as asuras, gods, boddhisattvas, kinnaras, gandharvas and apsaras. The images depicted on bas-relief often served as a reference for historians to research certain subjects, such as the study of architecture, weaponry, economy, fashion, and also the mode of transportation of 8th-century Maritime Southeast Asia. One of the famous renderings of an 8th-century Southeast Asian double outrigger ship is Borobudur Ship.

Some examples of Indonesian Statues and Reliefs

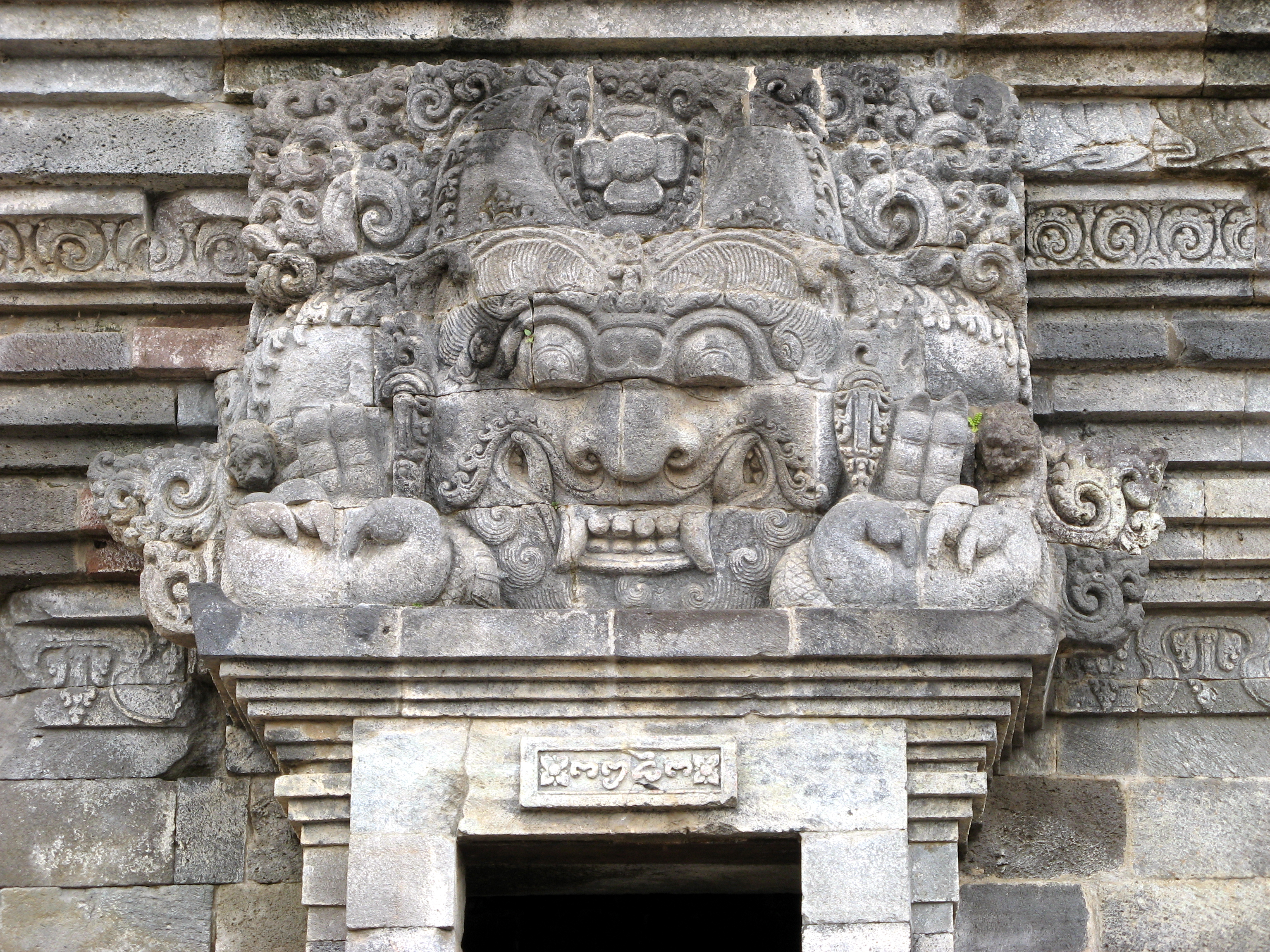
Statue of Batara Kala with horns and fangs above the door of a temple

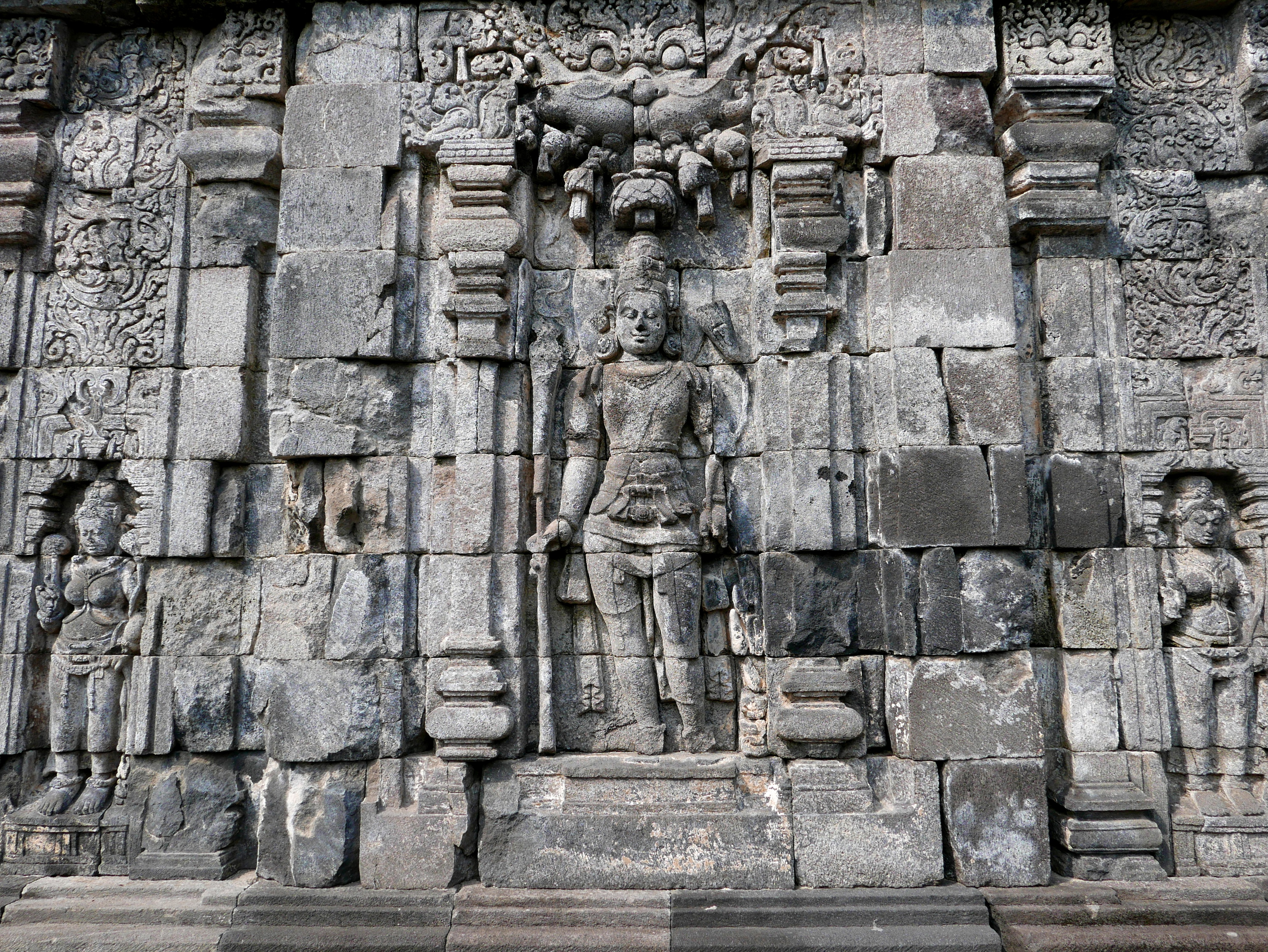
Bodhisattva statues and reliefs

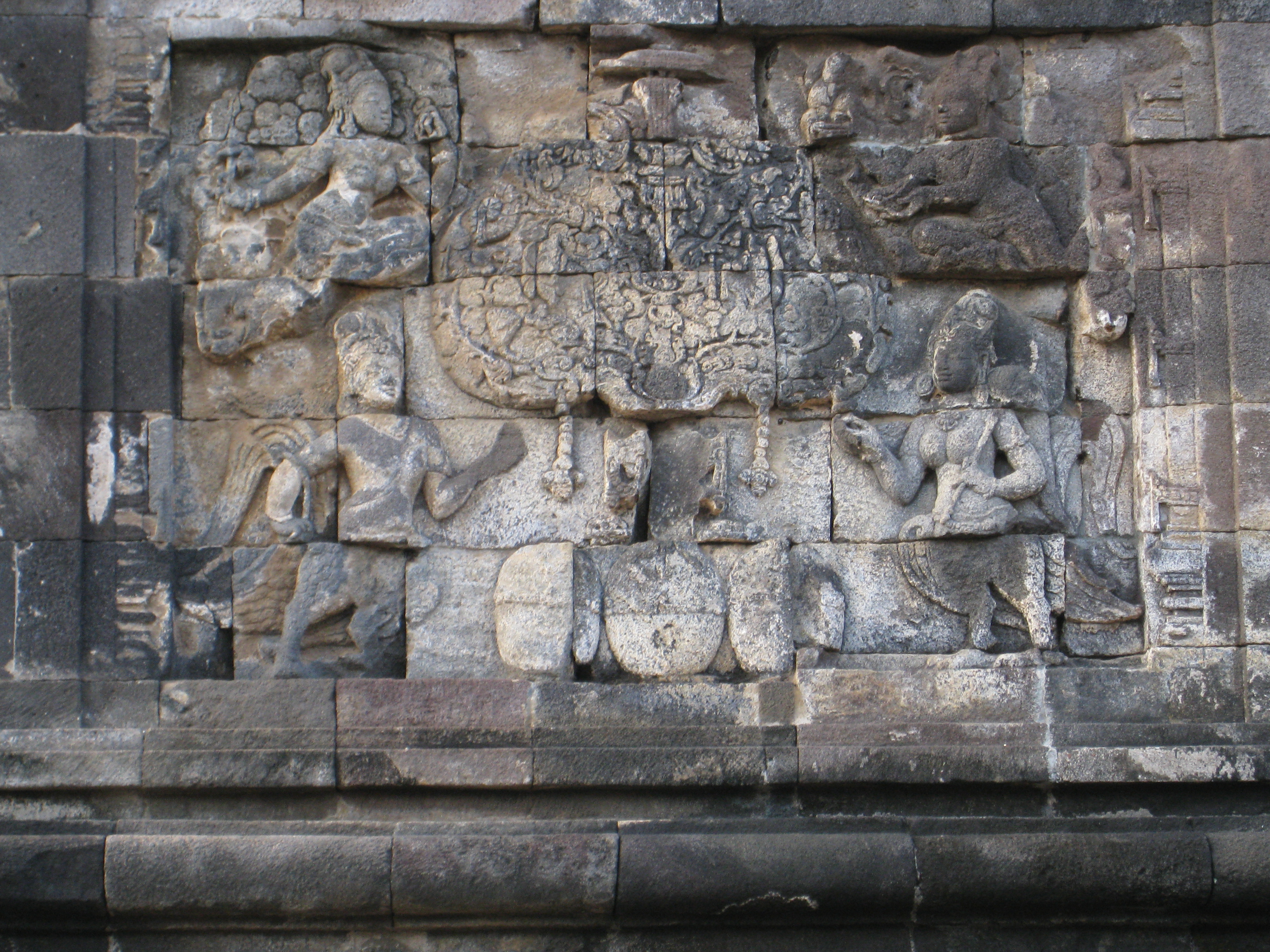
Reliefs of Kalpataru, the divine tree of life guarded by the mythical creatures Kinnara and Kinnari, also divine beings; Apsara and Devata

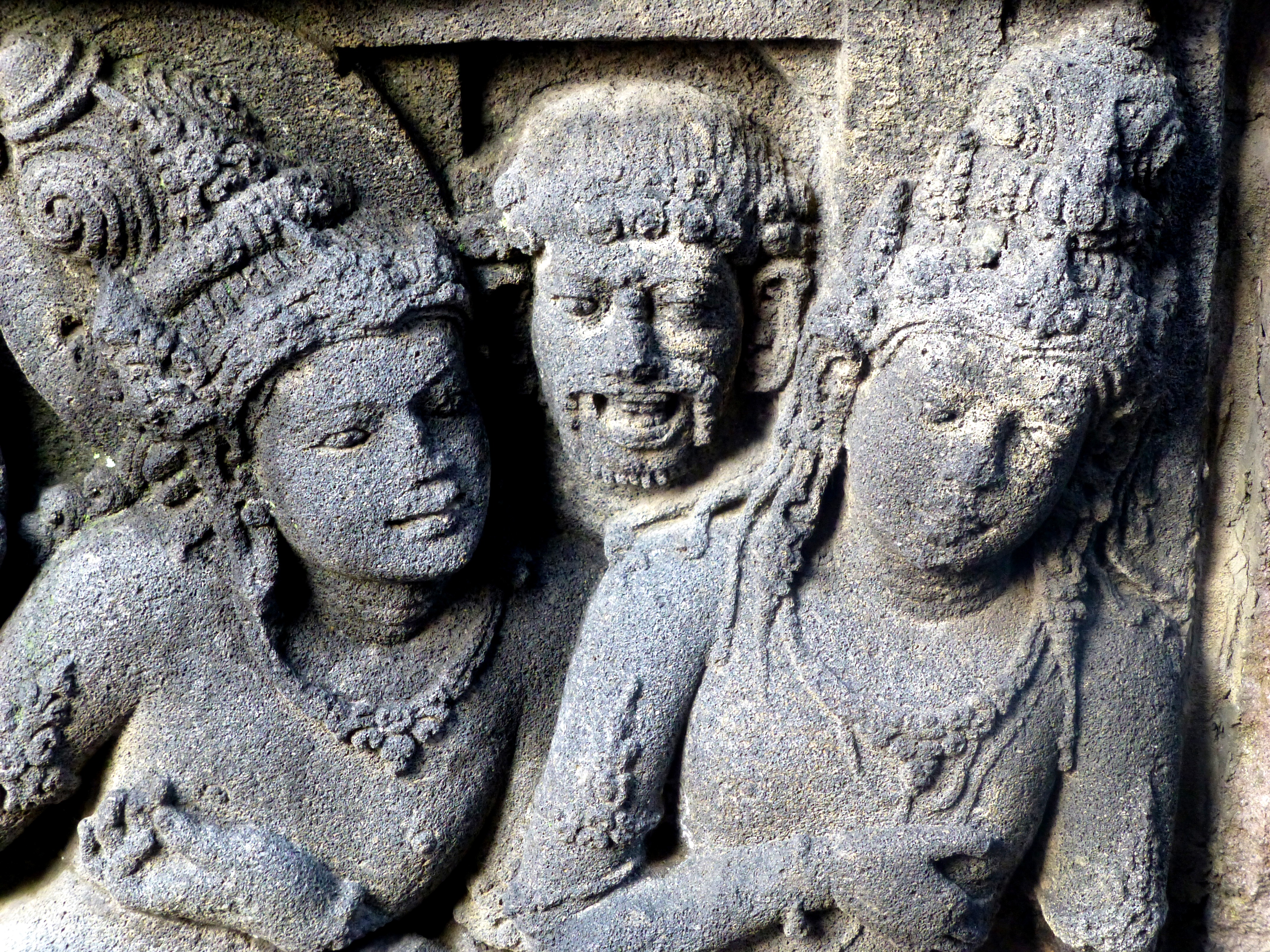
Brahma statues and reliefs

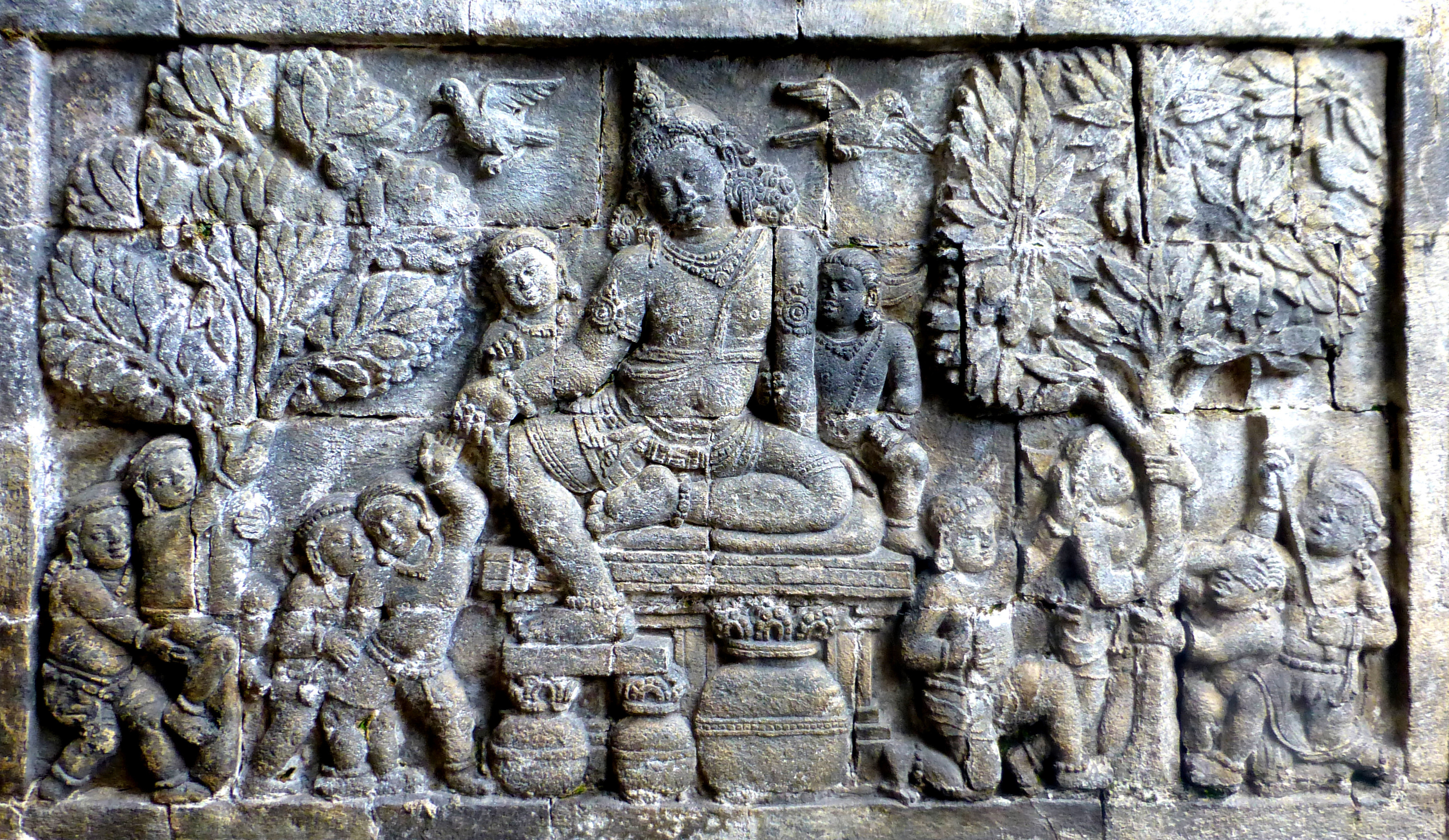
Kuvera, the god of wealth, depicted in a temple relief from ancient Java

== Architecture ==
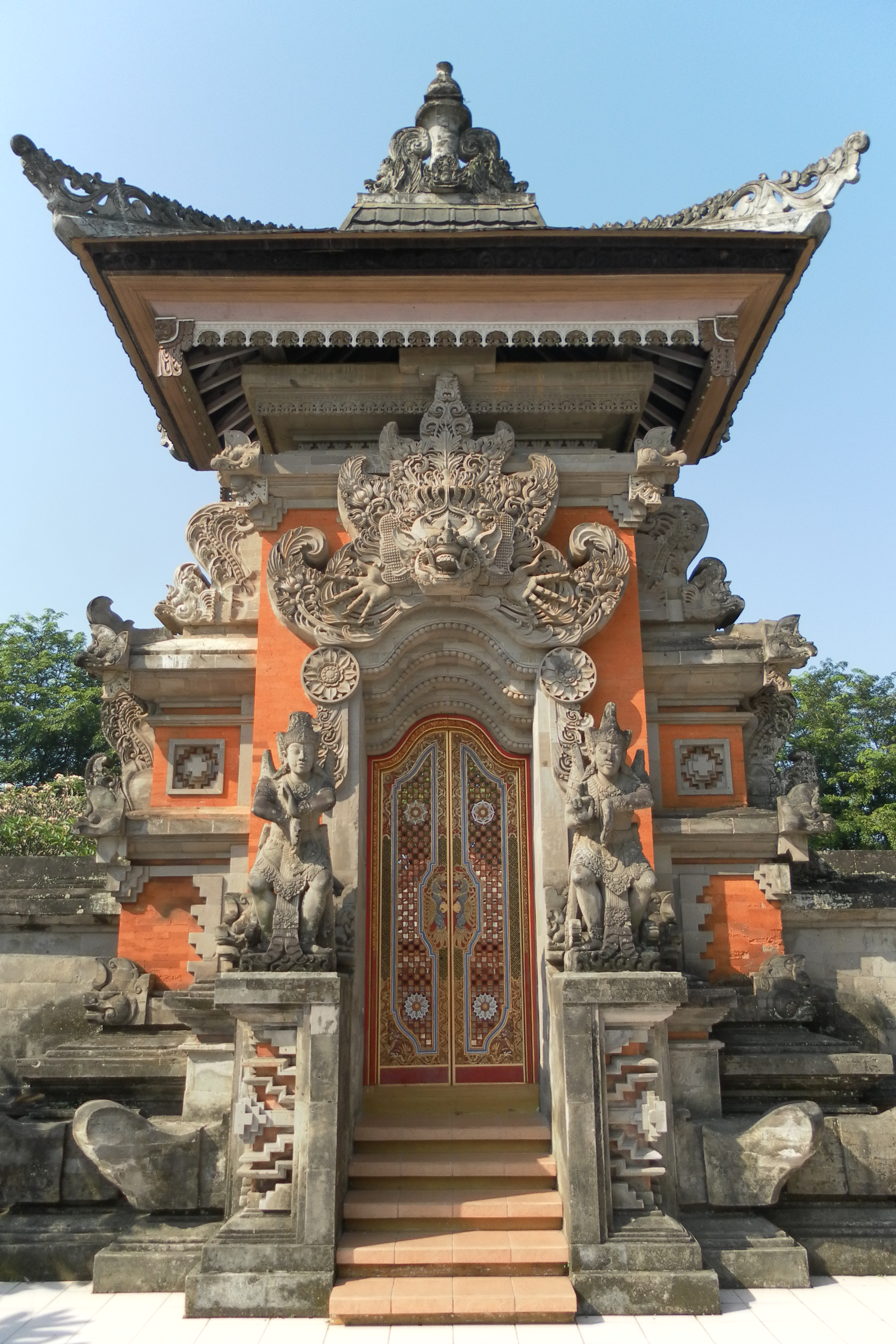
Roofed kori agung gate at the Bali Pavilion of Taman Mini Indonesia Indah

For centuries, Indonesian vernacular architecture has shaped settlements in Indonesia which commonly took the form of timber structures built on stilts dominated by a large roof. The most dominant foreign influences on Indonesian architecture were Indian, although European influences have been particularly strong since the 19th century and modern architecture in Indonesia is international in scope.

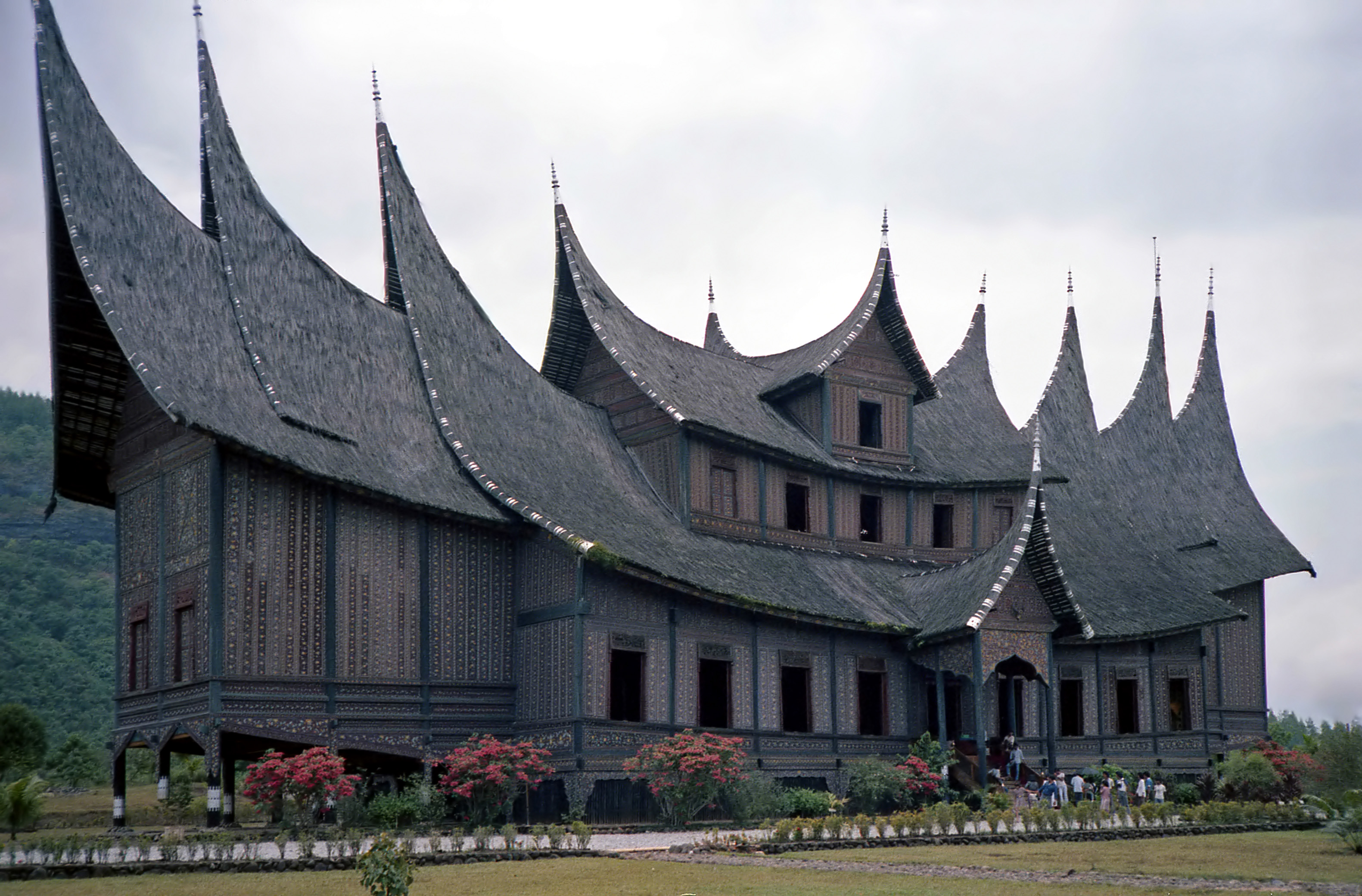
Pagaruyung Palace, It was built in the traditional Rumah Gadang vernacular architectural style.

As in much of Southeast Asia, traditional vernacular architecture in Indonesia is built on stilts, with the significant exceptions of Java and Bali. Notable stilt houses are those of the Dayak people in Borneo, the Rumah Gadang of the Minangkabau people in western Sumatra, the Rumah Bolon of the Batak people in northern Sumatra, and the Tongkonan of the Toraja people in Sulawesi. Oversized saddle roofs with large eaves, such as the homes of the Batak and the tongkonan of Toraja, are often bigger than the house they shelter. The fronts of Torajan houses are frequently decorated with buffalo horns, stacked one above another, as an indication of status. The outside walls also frequently feature decorative reliefs.

Candi is an Indonesian term to refer to ancient temples. Before the rise of Islam, between the 5th to 15th-century Dharmic faiths (Hinduism and Buddhism) were the majority in the Indonesian archipelago, especially in Java and Sumatra. As a result of numerous Hindu temples, locally known as candi, constructed and dominated the landscape of Java. According to local beliefs, Java valley had thousands of Hindu temples that co-existed with Buddhist temples, most of which were buried in the massive eruption of Mount Merapi in 1006 AD.

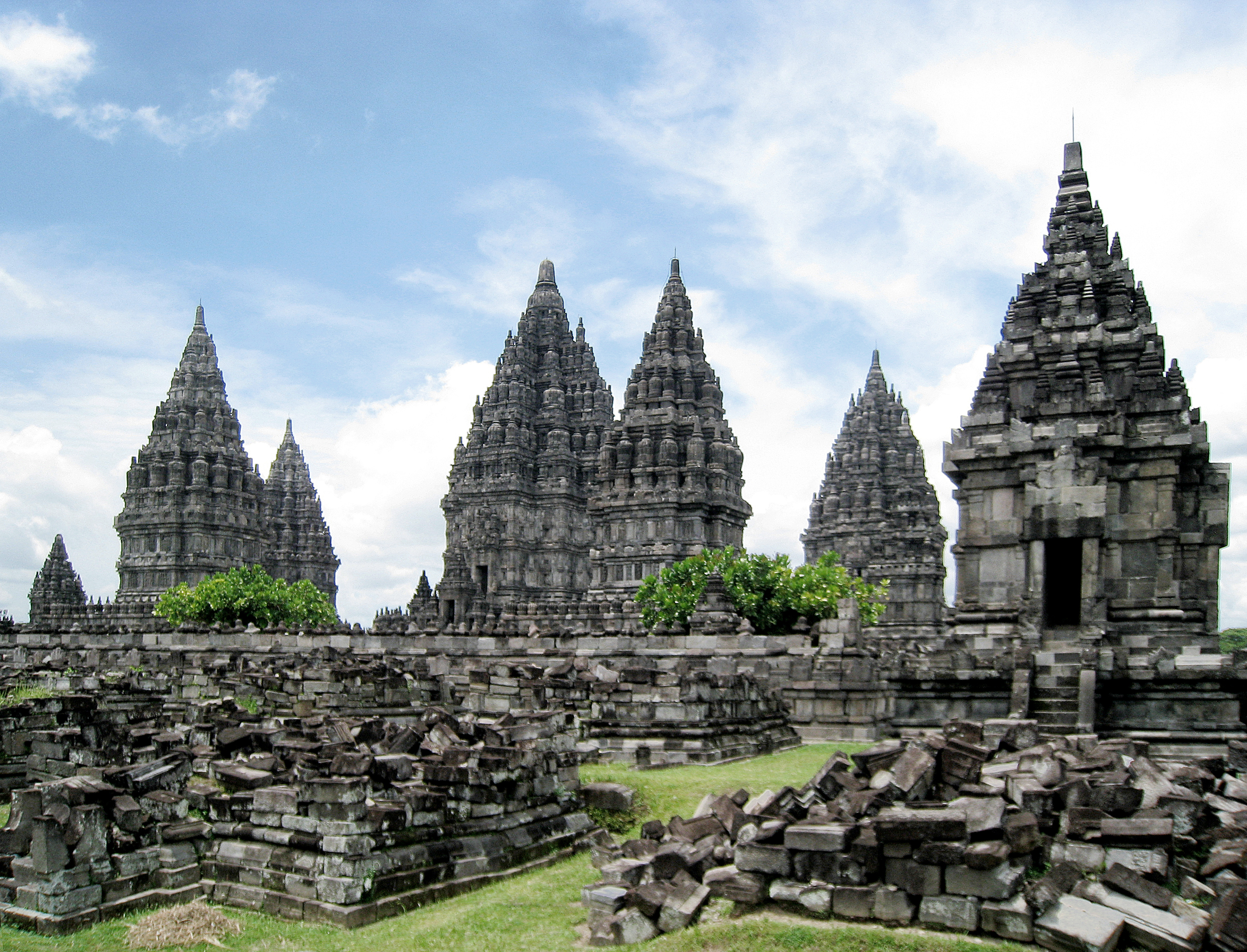
The Prambanan temple complex in Yogyakarta, this is the largest Hindu temple in Indonesia and the second largest Hindu temple in Southeast Asia

Between 1100 and 1500 additional Hindu temples were built, but abandoned by Hindus and Buddhists as Islam spread in Java circa the 15th to 16th century. The 8th-century Borobudur temple near Yogyakarta is the largest Buddhist temple in the world and is notable for incorporating about 2,672 relief panels and 504 Buddha statues into its structure, telling the story of the life of the Buddha. As the visitor ascends through the eight levels of the temple, the story unfolds, the final three levels simply containing stupas and statues of the Buddha. The building is said to incorporate a map of the Buddhist cosmos and is a masterful fusion of didactic narrative relief, spiritual symbolism, monumental design and the serene meditative environs. The whole monument itself resembles a giant stupa, but seen from above it forms a mandala.

The nearby 9th-century temple complex at Prambanan contains some of the best-preserved examples of Hindu temple architecture in Java. The temple complex comprises eight main shrines, surrounded by 224 smaller shrines. The majority of Hindu temples in Java were dedicated to Shiva, who Javanese Hindus considered as the God who commands the energy to destroy, recombine and recreate the cycle of life. Small temples were often dedicated to Shiva and his family (wife Durga, son Ganesha). Larger temple complexes include temples for Vishnu and Brahma, but the most majestic, sophisticated and central temple was dedicated to Shiva.

Examples of traditional houses (Rumah Adat)

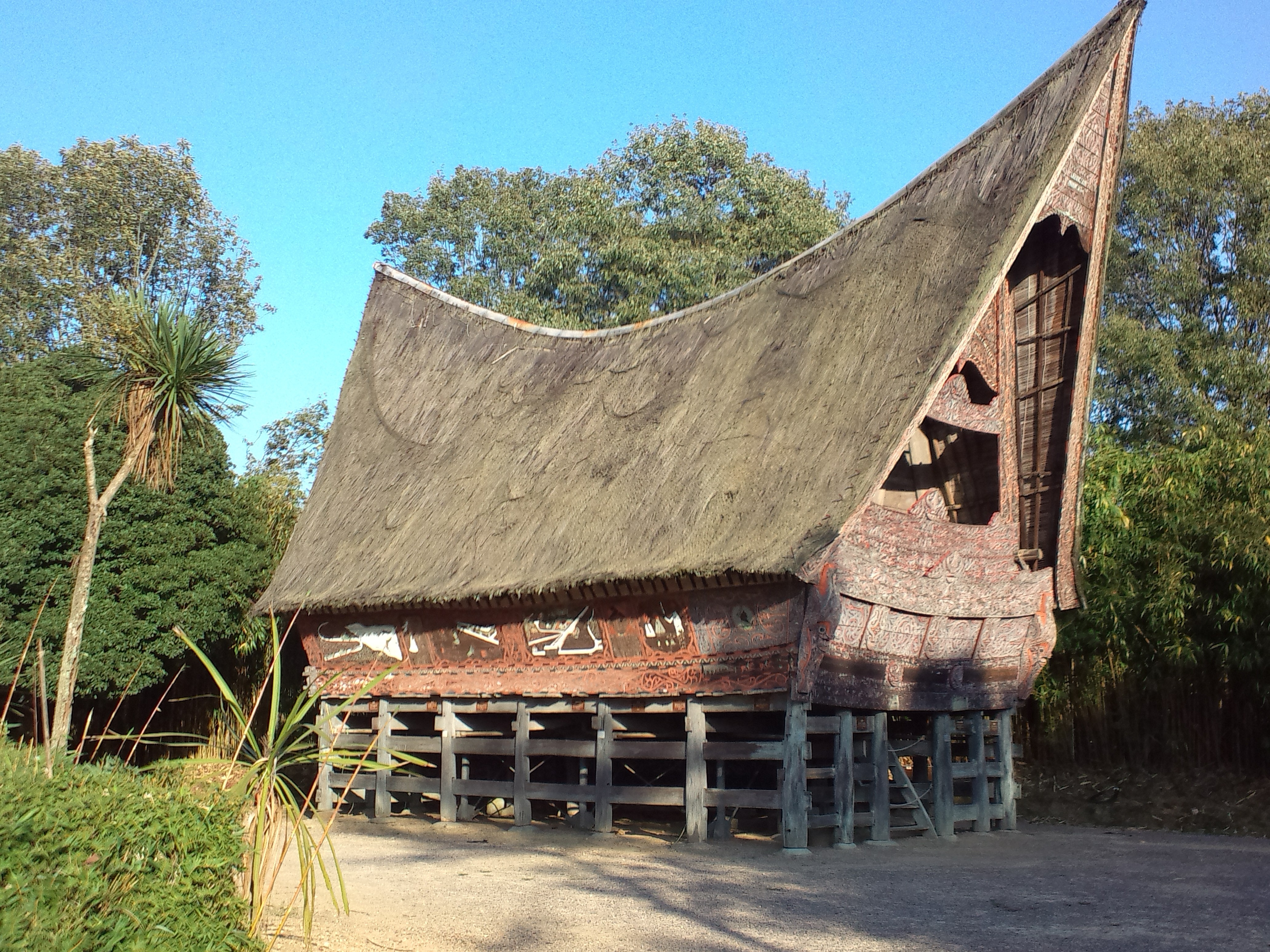
Bolon House of Batak people, North Sumatra

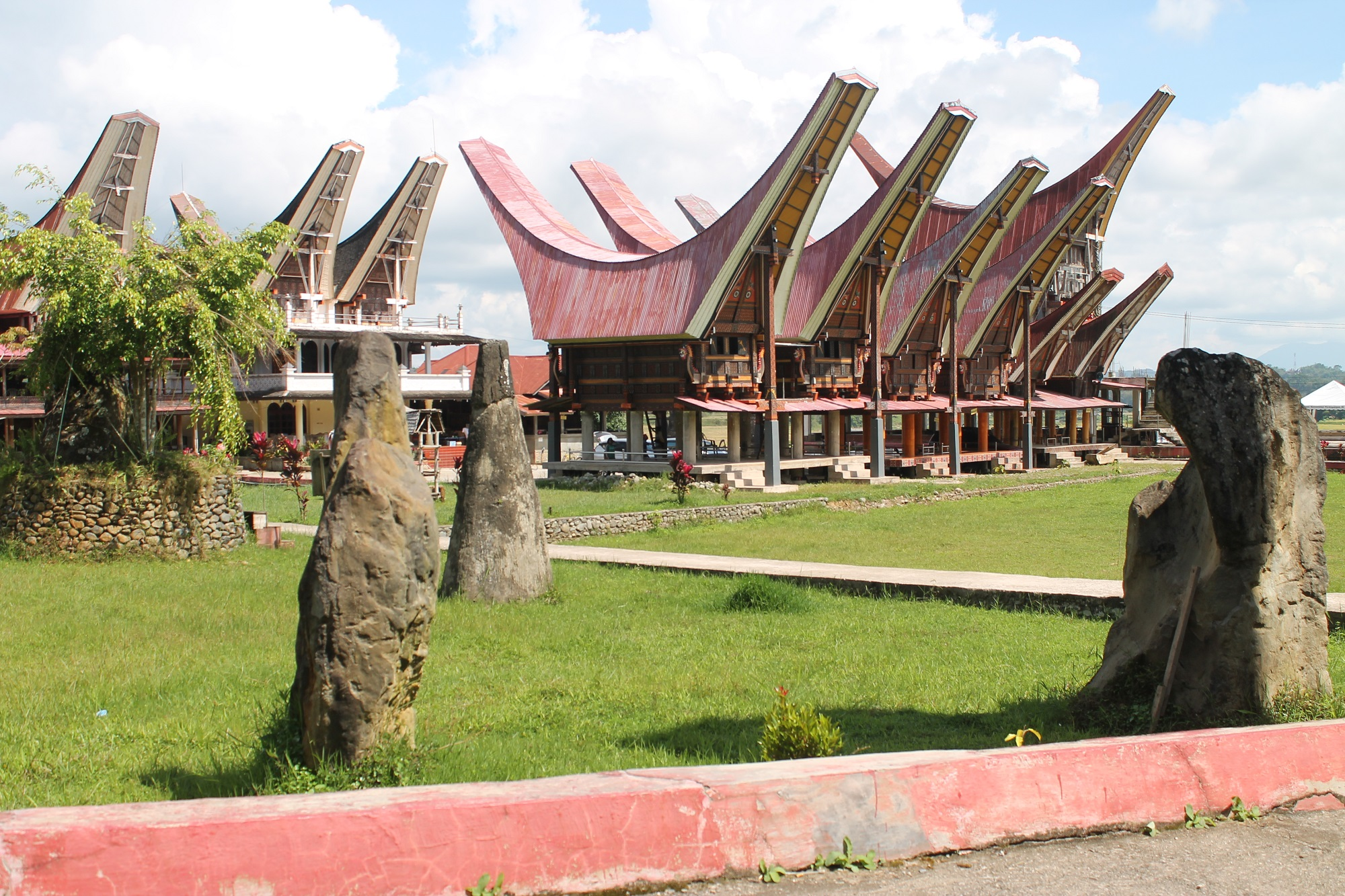
Tongkonan of Toraja people, South Sulawesi

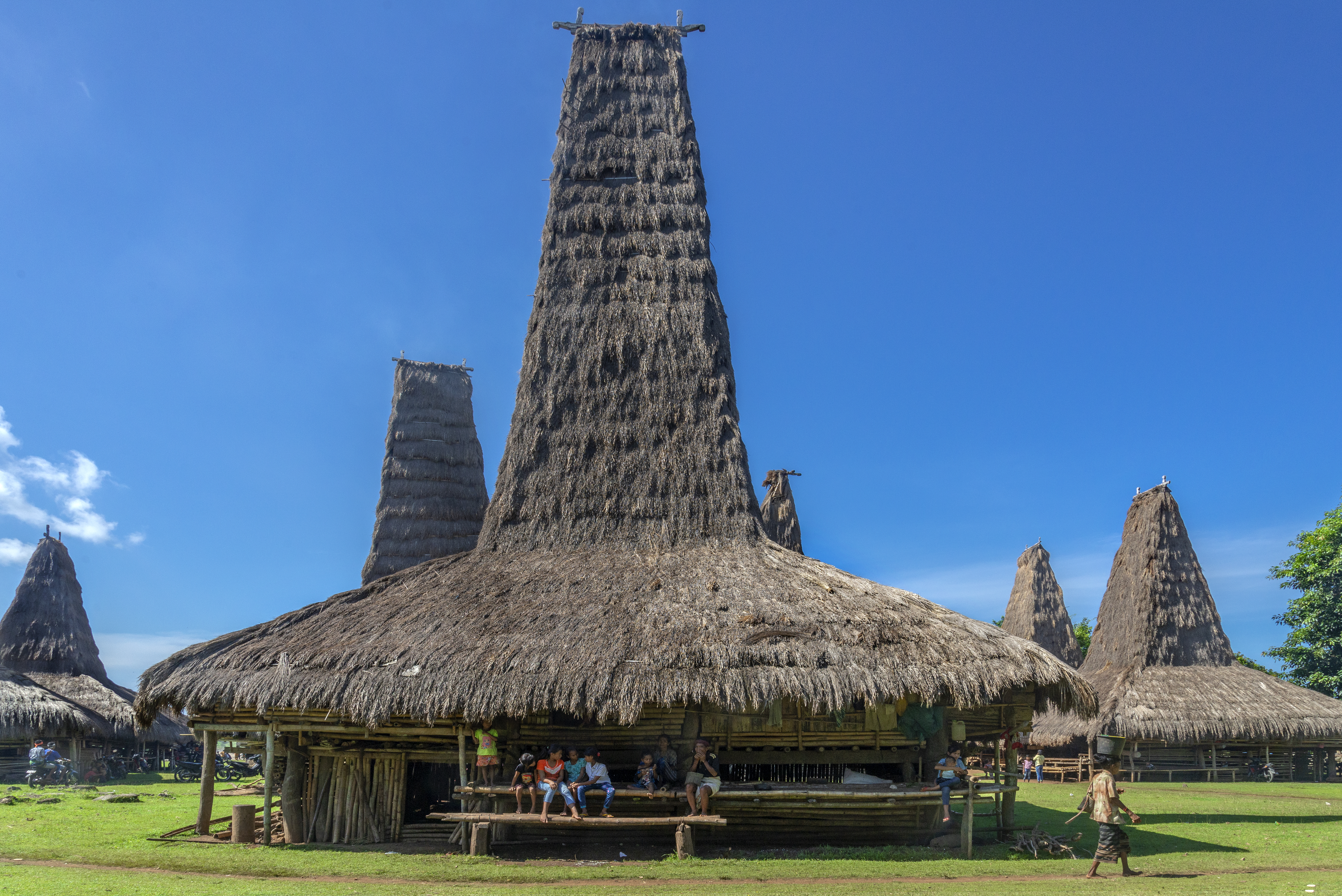
Sumba house, East Nusa Tenggara

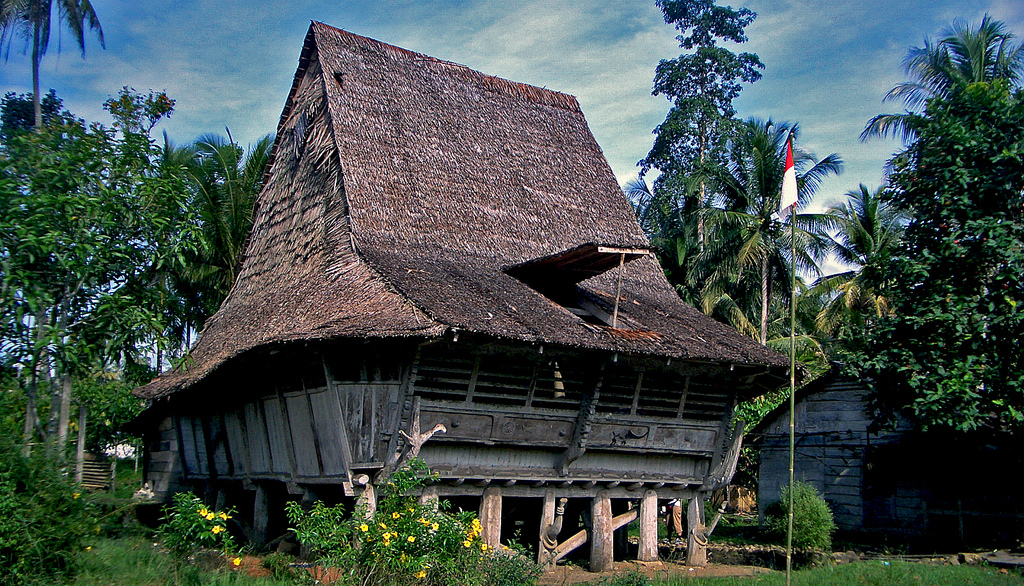
Omo sebua, Nias Islands

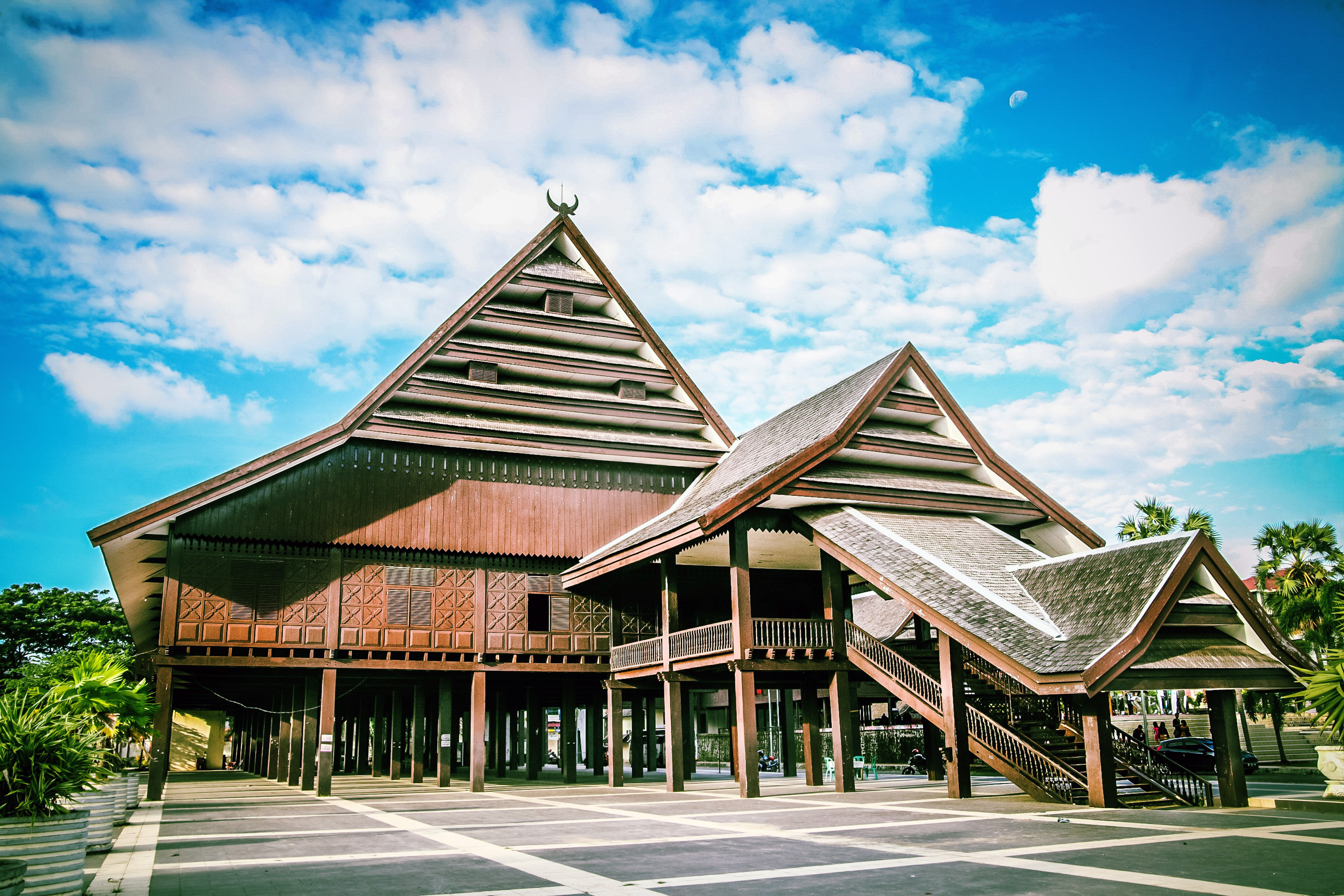
Bugis house, South Sulawesi
Examples of Indonesian temple (Candi)

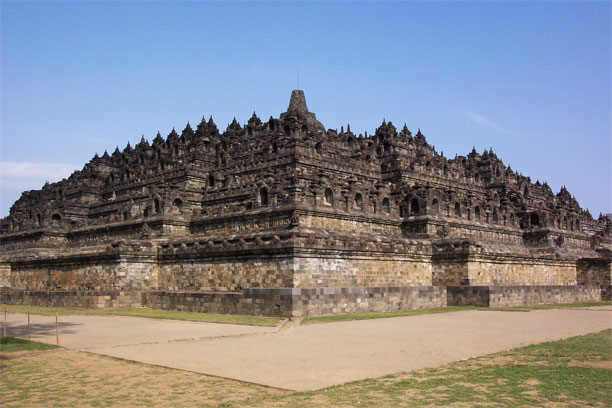
Borobudur, candi in Central Java, the largest Buddhist temple in world

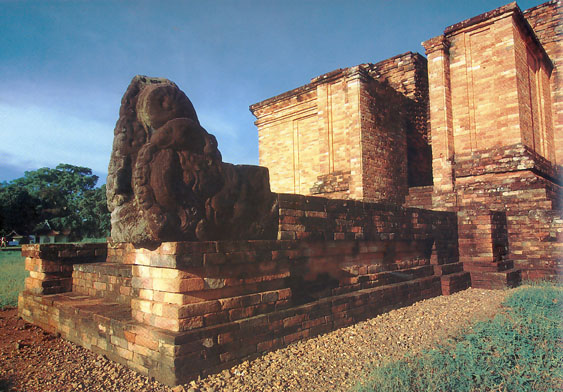
Muaro Jambi Temple Compounds in Jambi, is one of Southeast Asia's largest ancient temple complexes

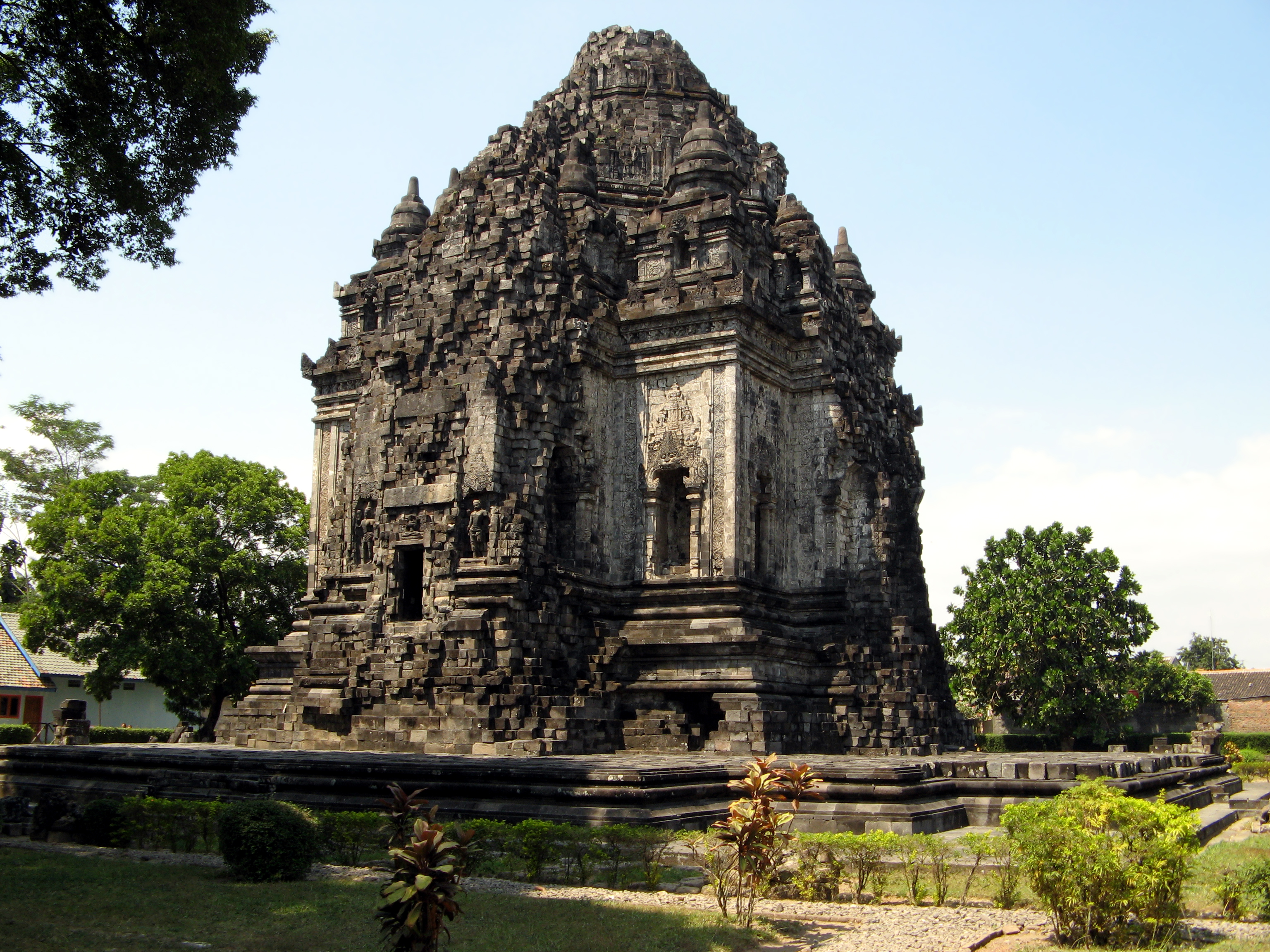
Kalasan Temple in Yogyakarta

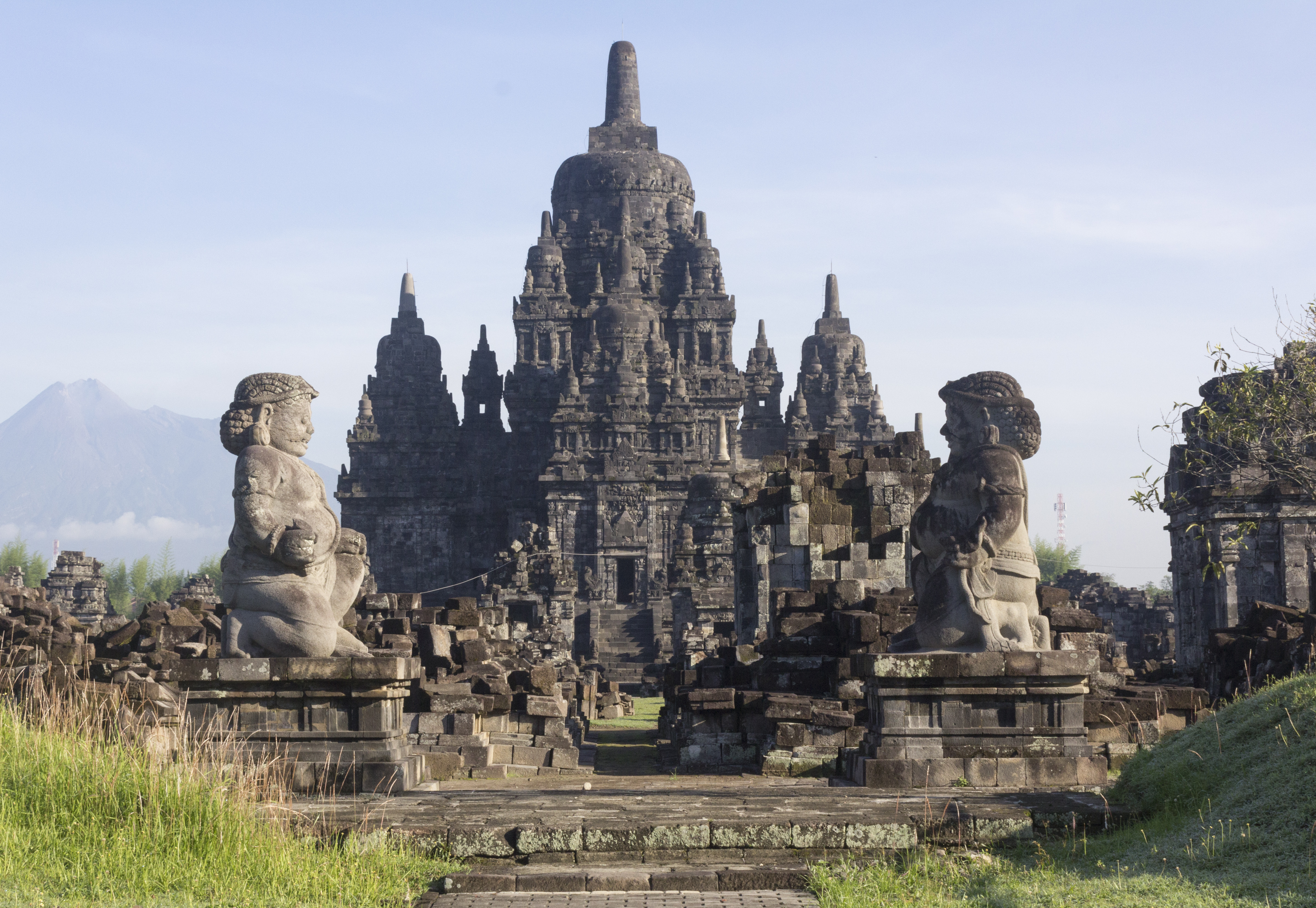
Sewu Temple in Central Java

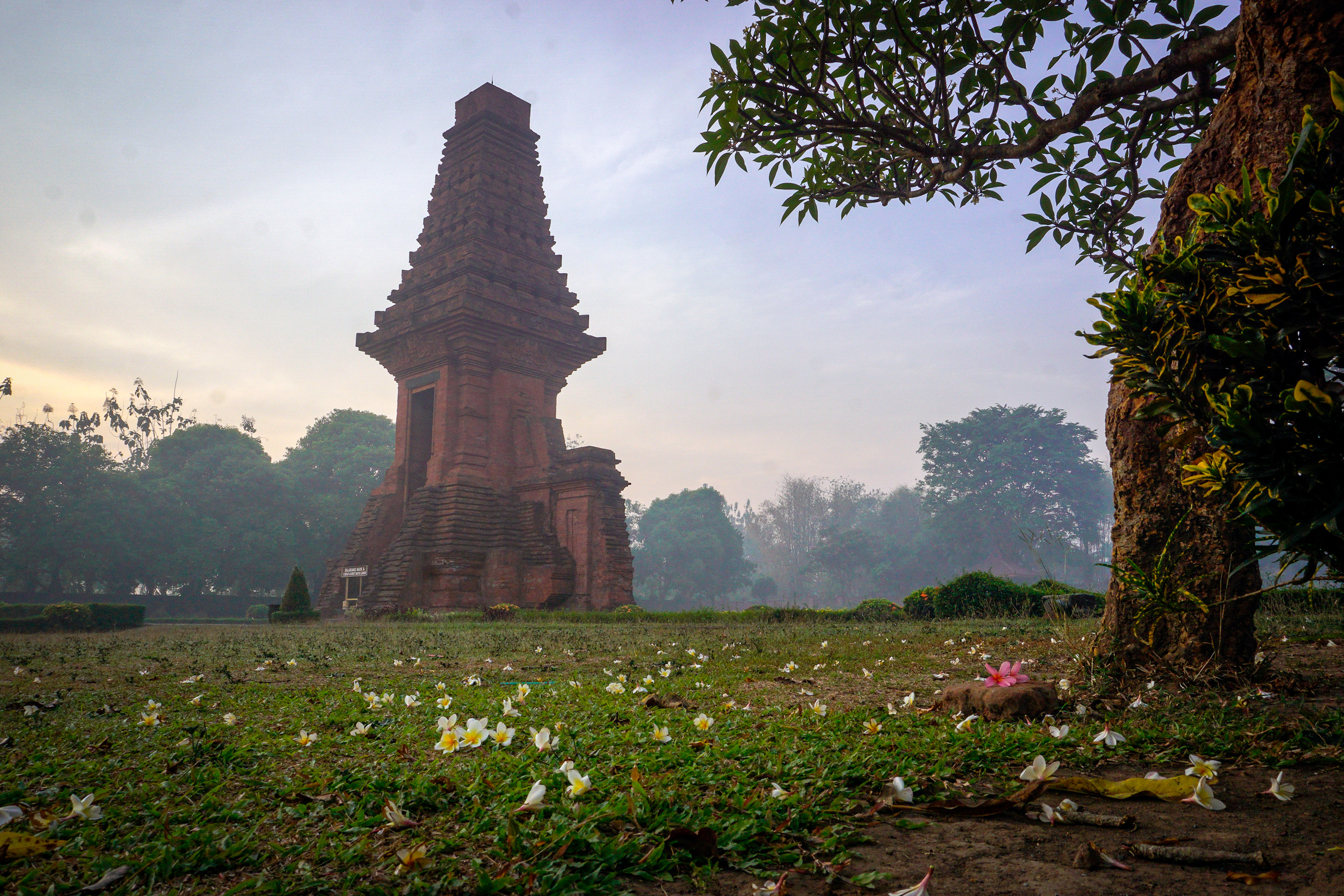
Bajang Ratu Temple, a 14th-century Majapahit-era gate in East Java
Some examples of Architecture in Indonesia

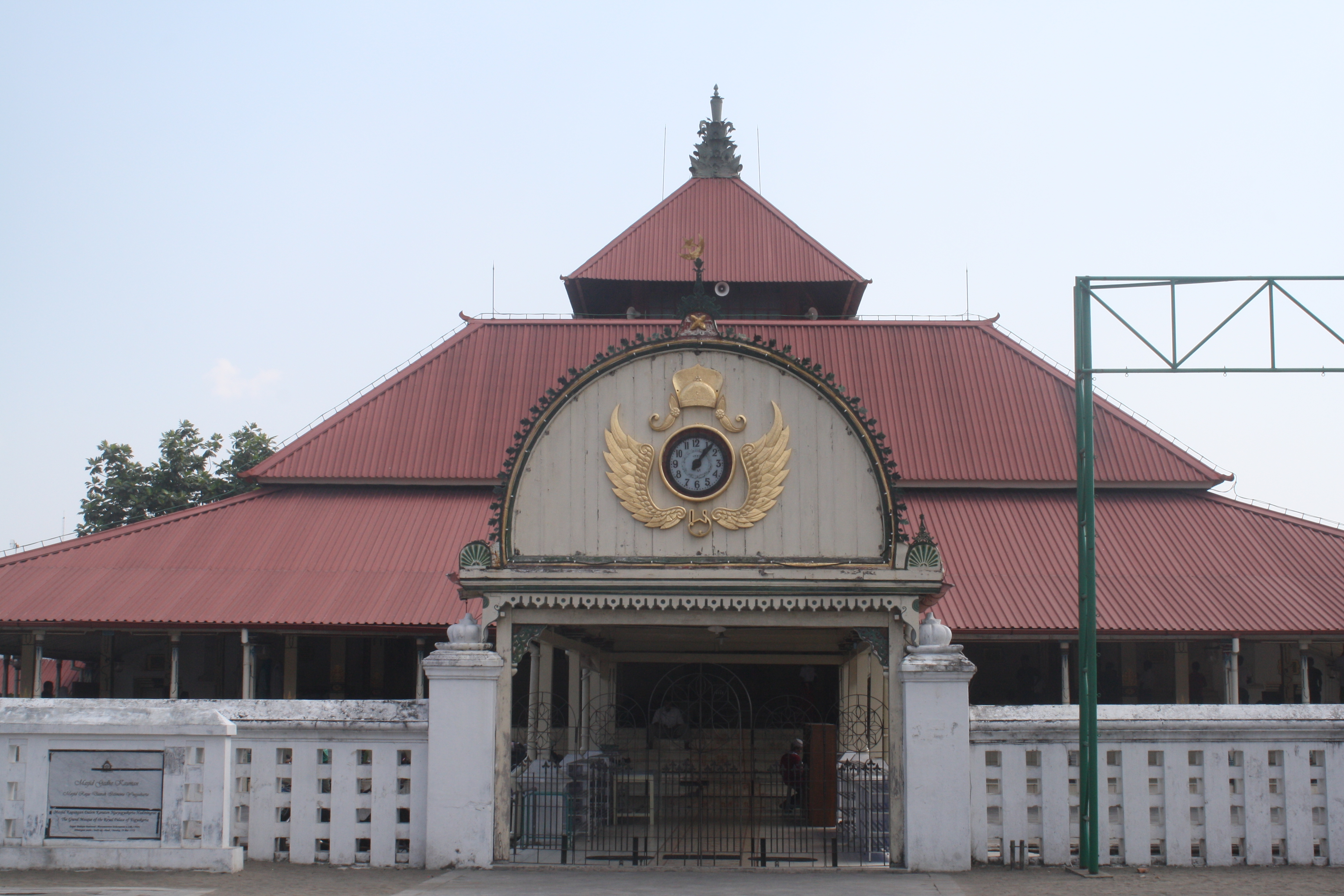
The Tajug or Meru type roof is commonly used on sacred buildings in Indonesia, especially Java

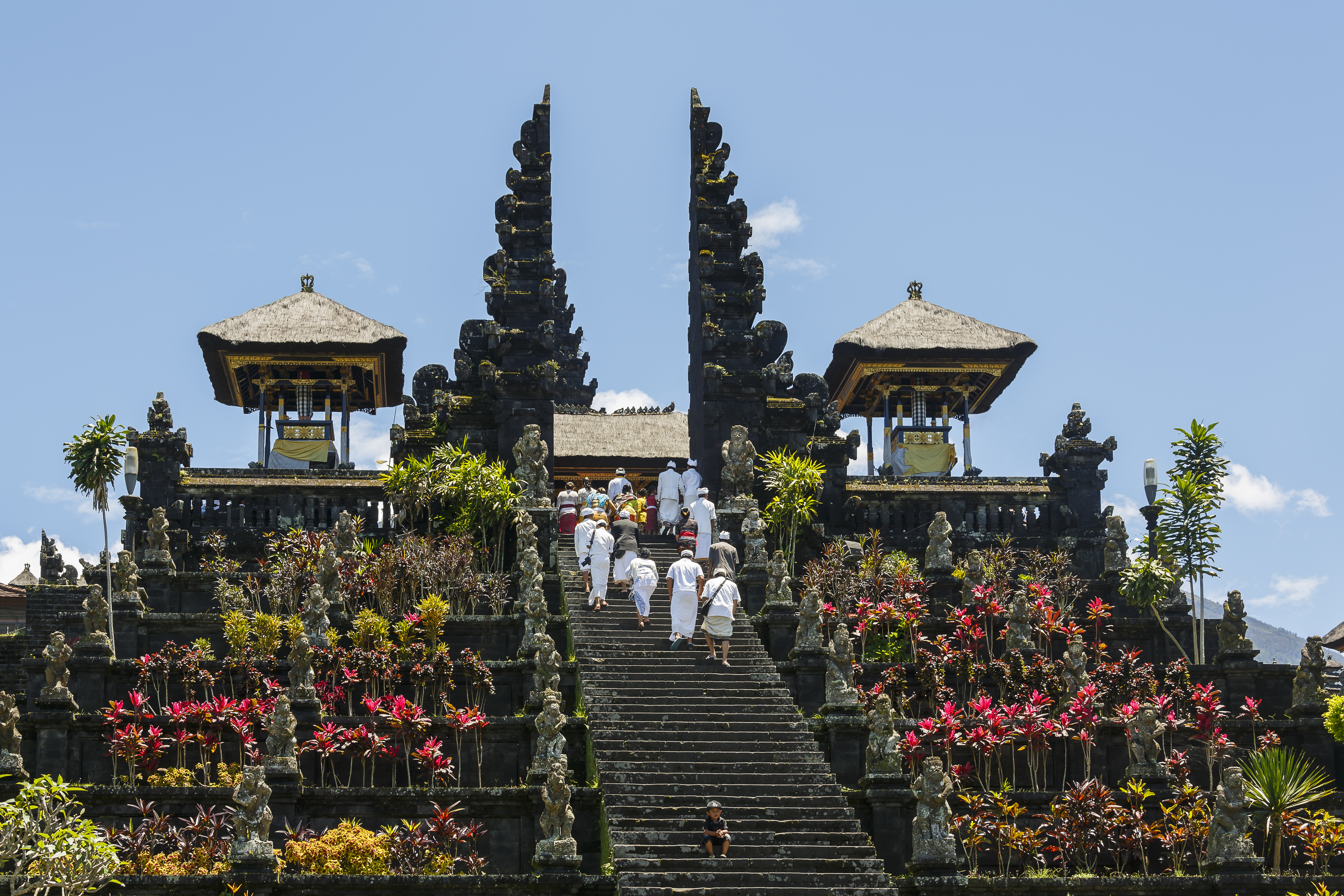
Besakih Temple with Balinese (Pura) architectural style

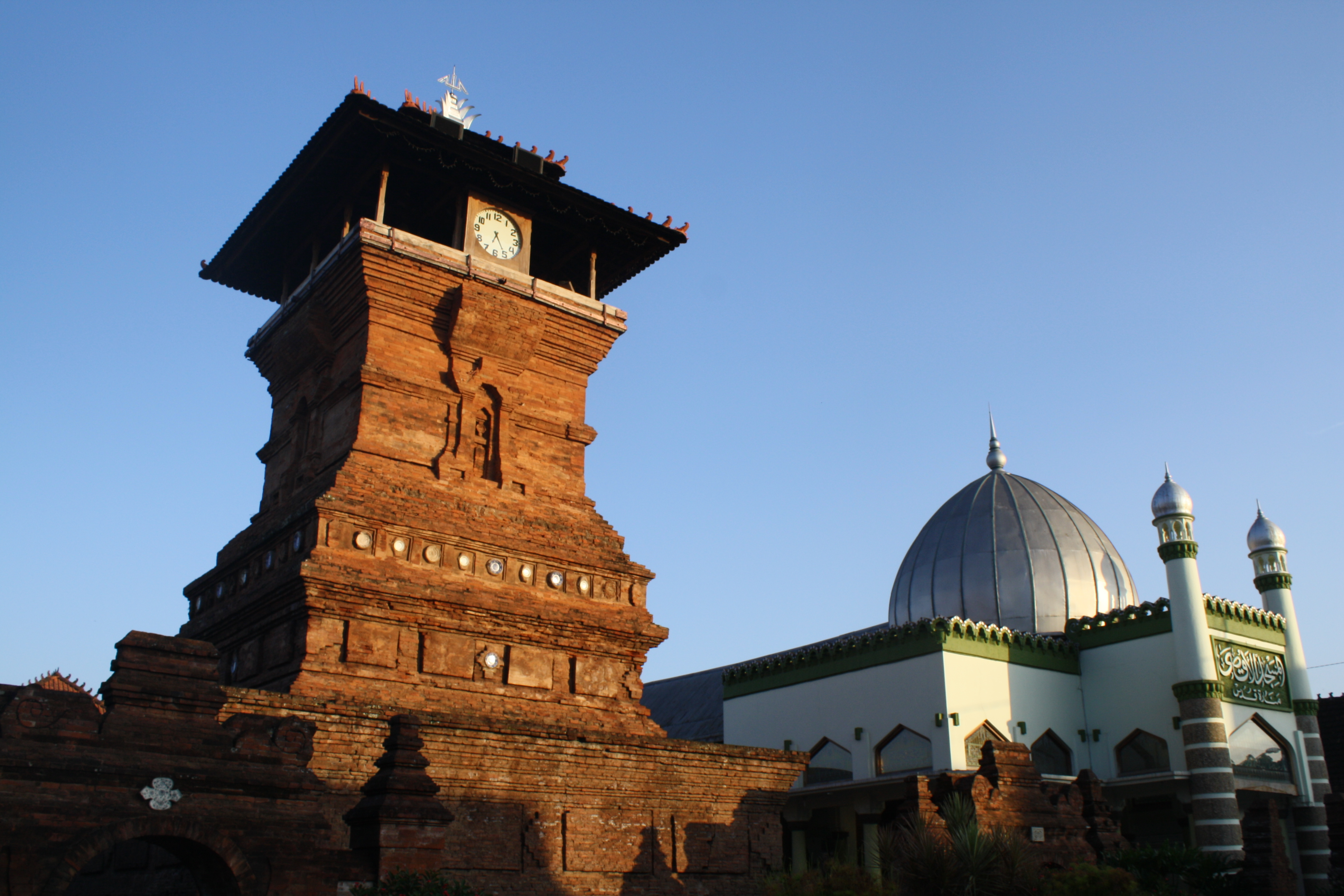
Menara Kudus Mosque, a mosque with traditional Indonesian architectural style

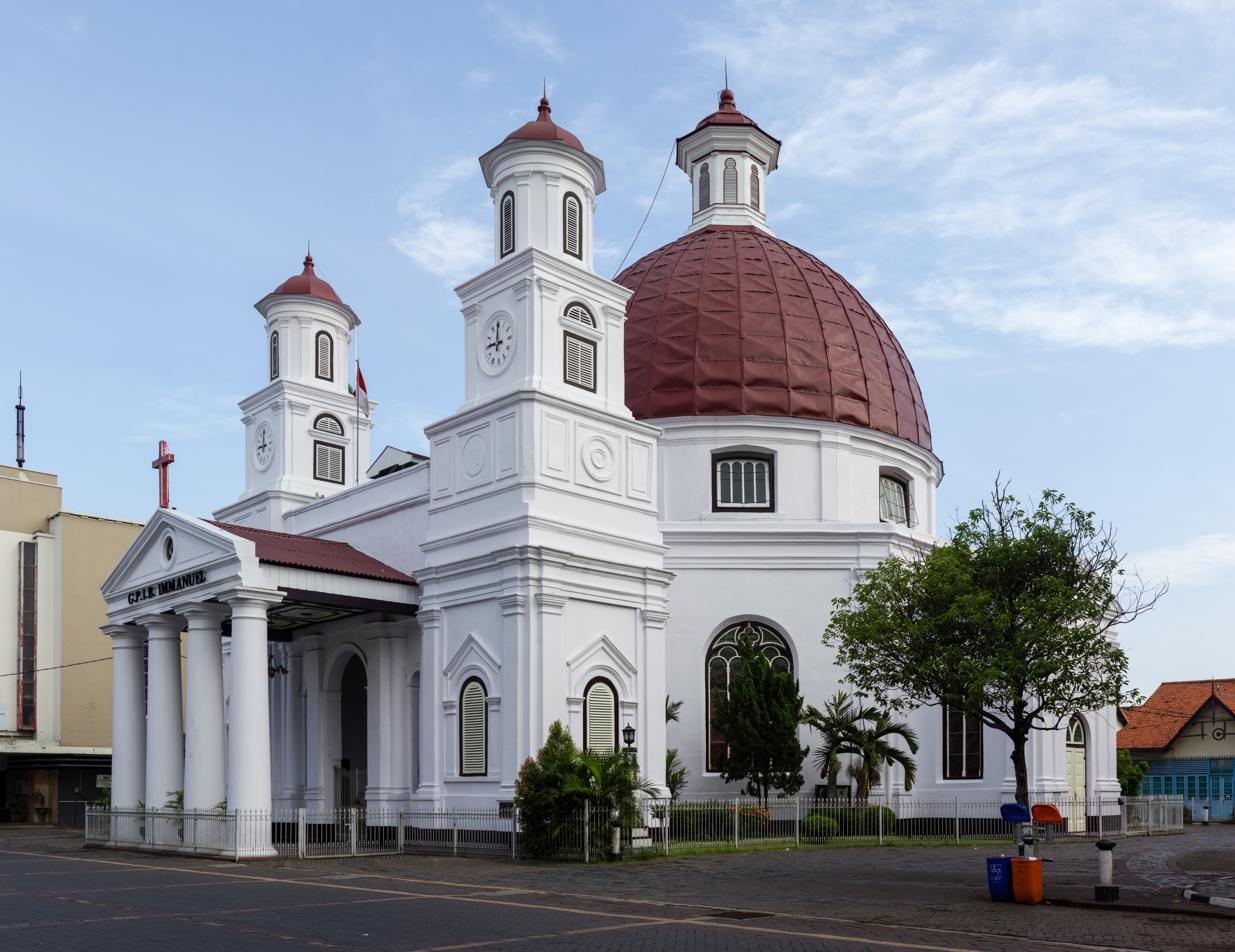
Blenduk Church in Semarang, a church with a colonial architectural style

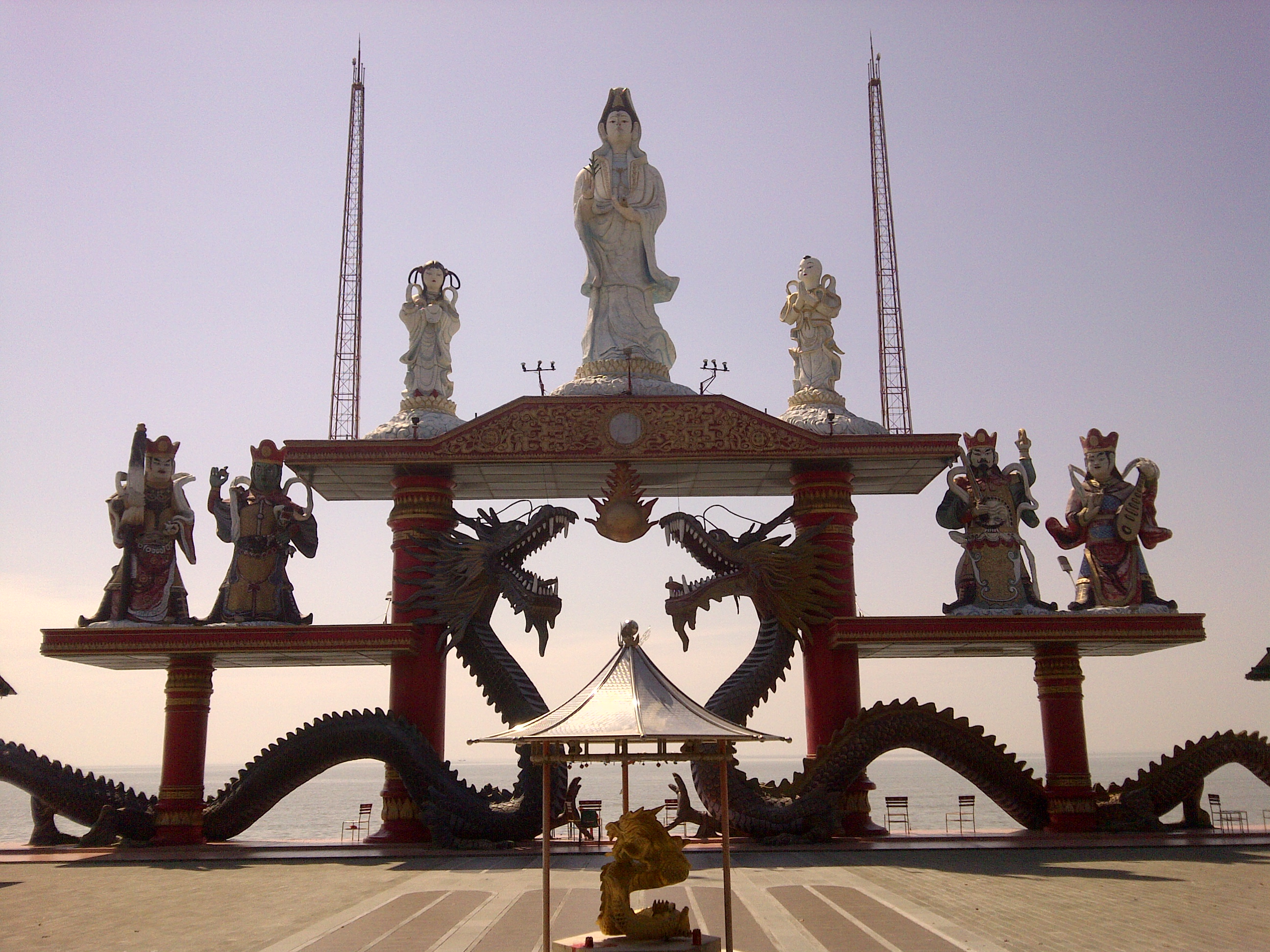
Kuil Sanggar Agung Surabaya, architecture with Chinese influences

== Crafts ==
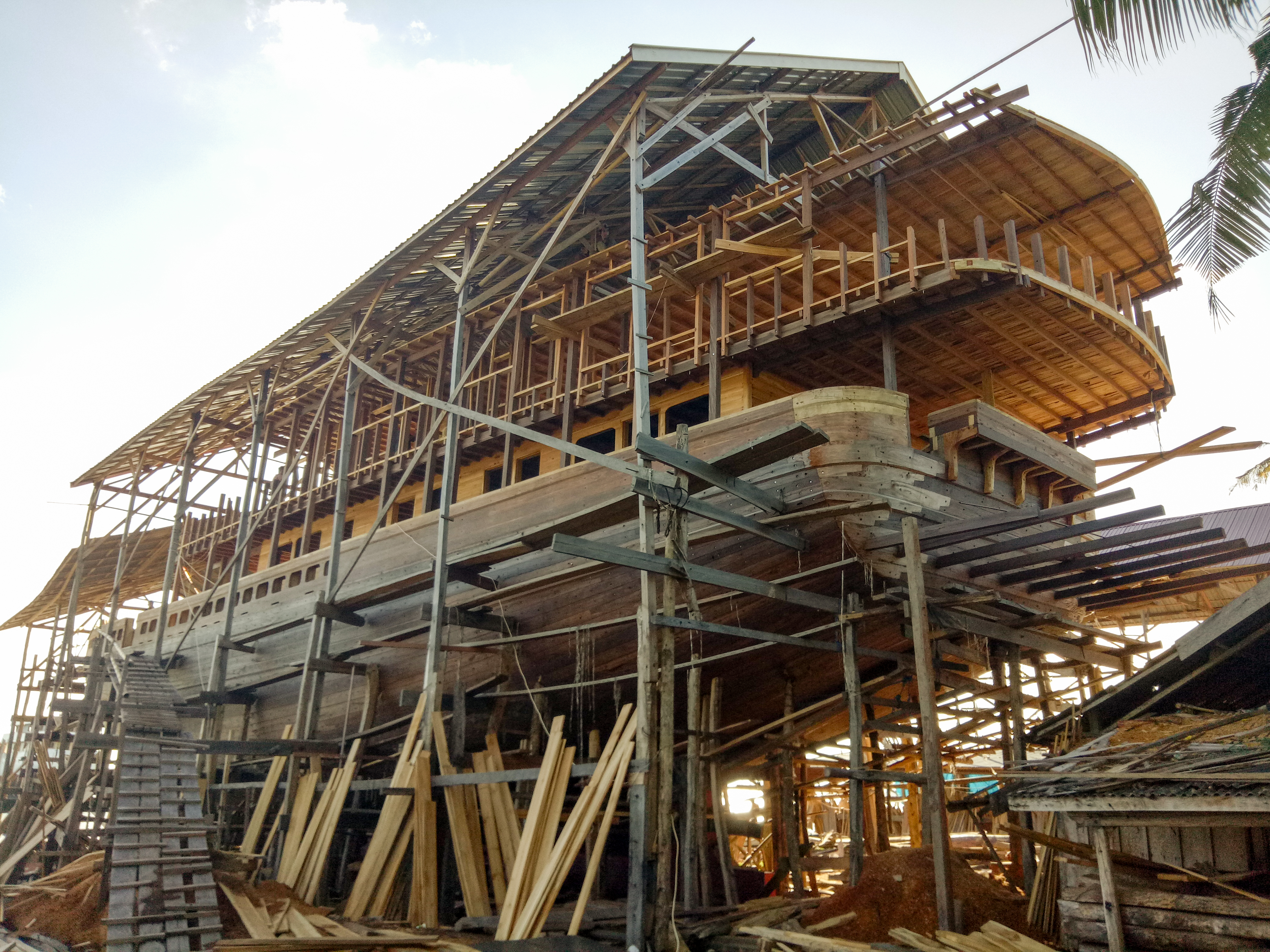
Bugis Pinisi shipbuilding

Indonesia is considered as home of world handicraft. Every ethnic group has its own uniqueness, style, and philosophy of crafting. Most of them are made from wooden, bone, fabric, stone, and paper. These natural materials were crafted using hands into profitable and aesthetic items. Handicraft manufacturing serves not only as an important economic sector, but also a tradition and has a social function as well. The handicraft industry employs thousands of people in towns and villages across the country. About half a billion dollar worth of handicraft is exported every year, and many more is consumed domestically.

Handicraft production varies across Indonesia, with different regions specialising in particular materials and techniques. West Sumatra and South Sumatra produce songket textiles. Villages in the Lesser Sunda Islands produce ikat while provinces in Kalimantan are long known for their basketry and weaving using rattan and other natural fabrics. Wood art produced by the Asmat people of Papua is important and innovative. Cities along Java's northern coast, Cirebon, Pekalongan, and Rembang are known as centres of batik. Cirebon and Jepara are important cities in furniture, producing rattan and carved wood respectively, while Tasikmalaya is known for embroidery. Pasuruan also produces furniture and other products and support stores and galleries in Bali. Bandung and Surabaya, both modern, cosmopolitan, and industrialized cities—much like Jakarta but on a lesser scale—are creative cities with a variety of innovative startups.

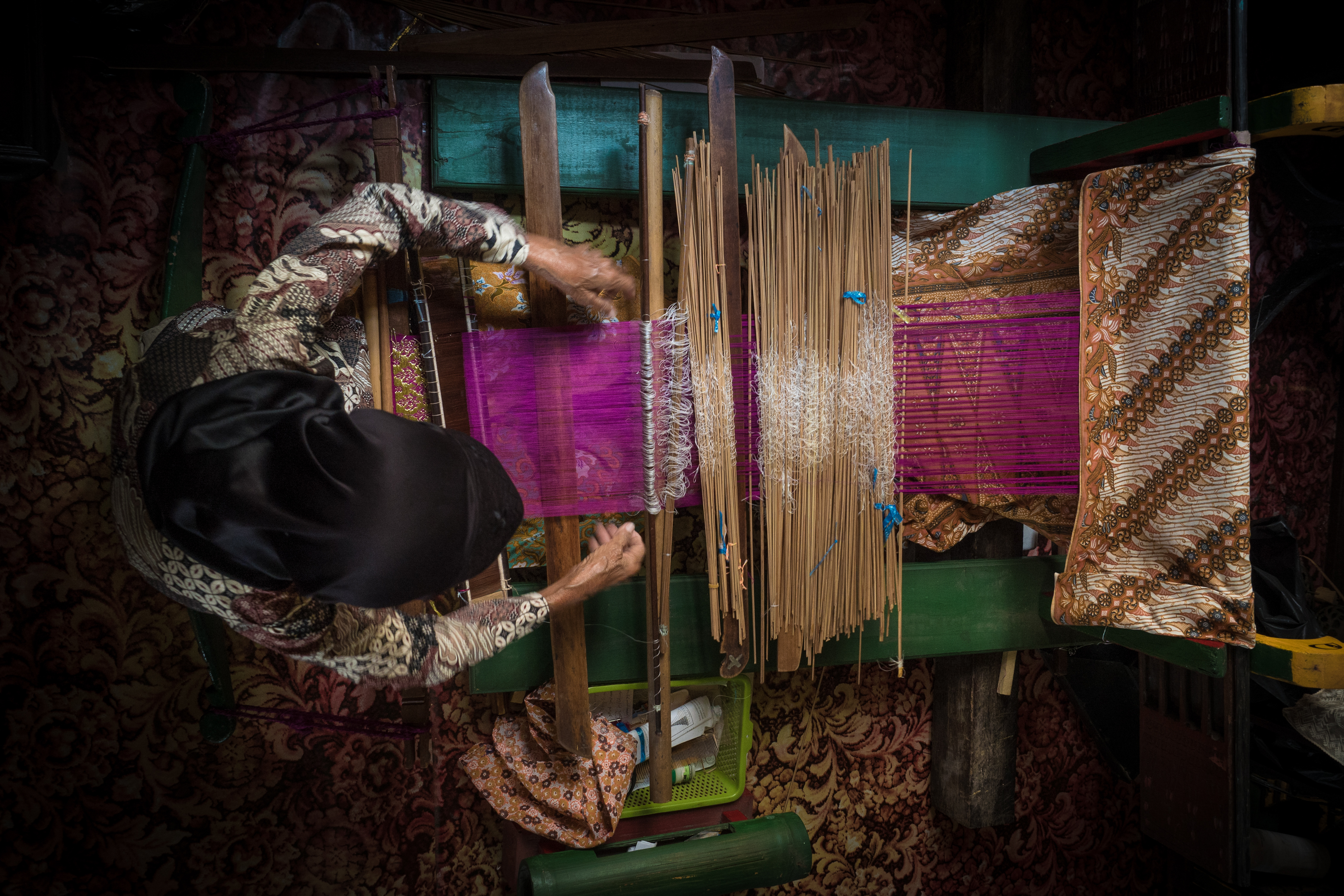
A traditional tailor (Tenun) from Sumatra, in the process of sewing

Several Indonesian islands are famous for their batik, ikat and songket cloth. Once on the brink of disappearing, batik and later ikat, found a new lease on life when former President Suharto promoted wearing batik shirts on official occasions. In addition to the traditional patterns with their special meanings, used for particular occasions, batik designs have become creative and diverse over the last few years.

Other noted Indonesian crafts are Jepara wood carving and Kris. In 2005, UNESCO recognised Kris as one of Masterpiece of the Oral and Intangible Heritage of Humanity from Indonesia.

In 2012, Noken was listed in the UNESCO Intangible Cultural Heritage Lists as a cultural heritage of Indonesia. Women carrying noken are still a common sight in Wamena.

Being the best-known Indonesian sailing-vessel, Phinisi became the tagline for the 2017 inscription of ''The Art of Boatbuilding in South Sulawesi'' in the UNESCO's Representative List of the Intangible Cultural Heritage of Humanity.

Some Indonesian Traditional Fabrics

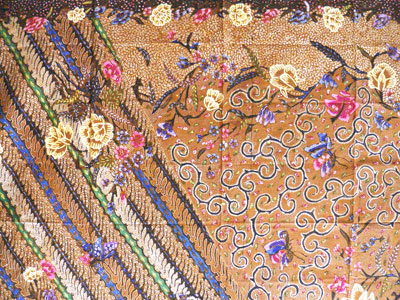
Batik

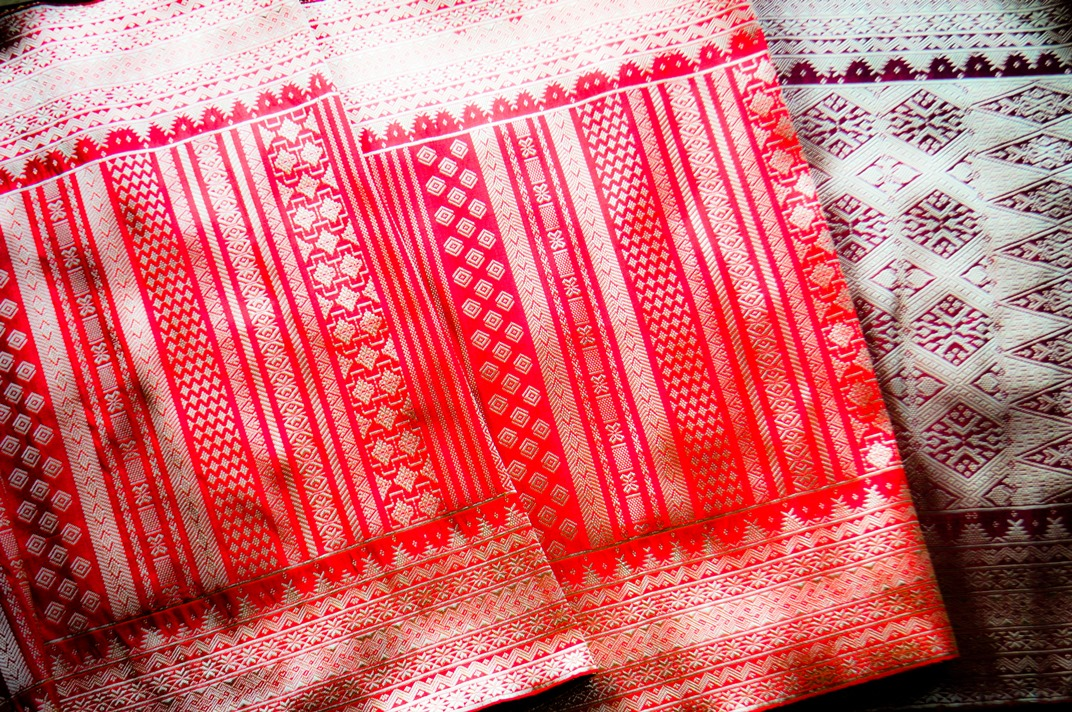
Songket

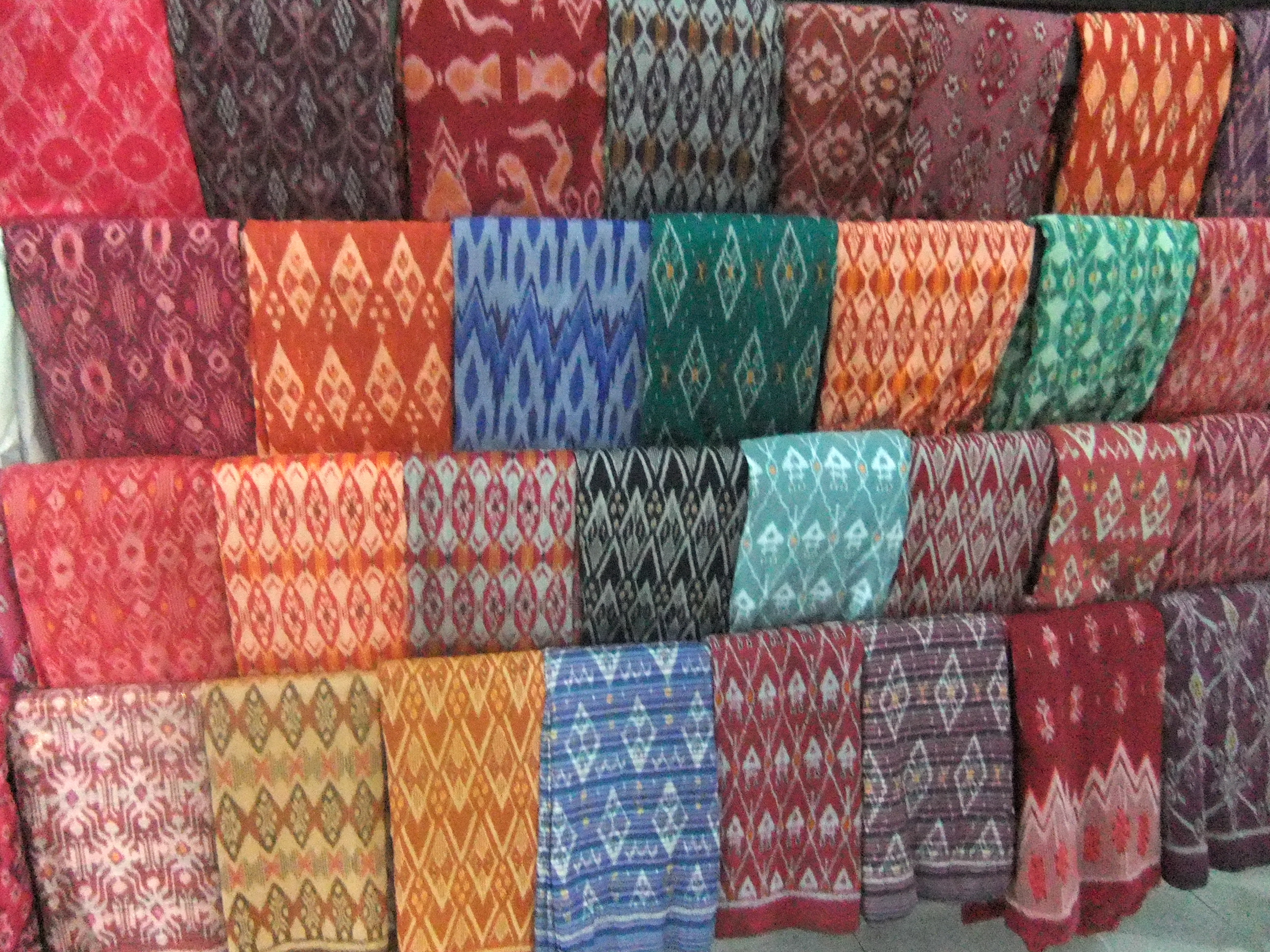
Ikat

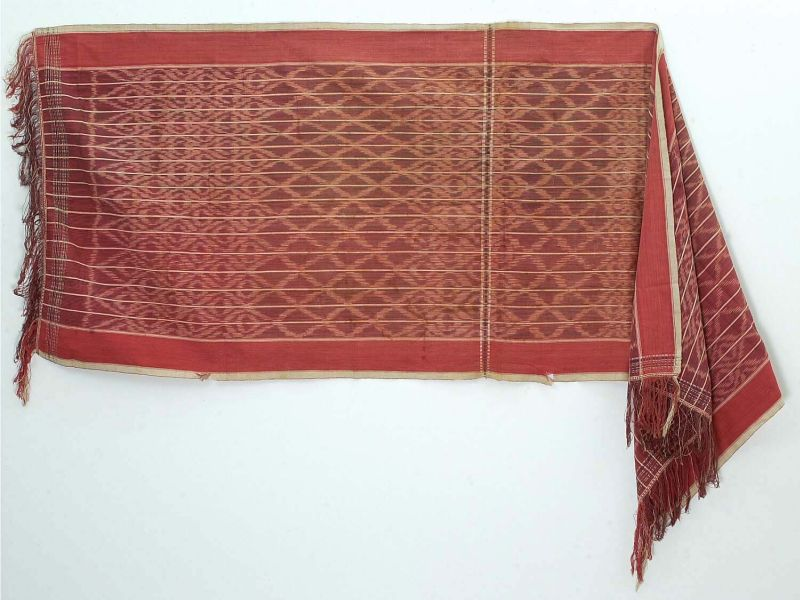
Ulos
Some Indonesian Traditional Weapons

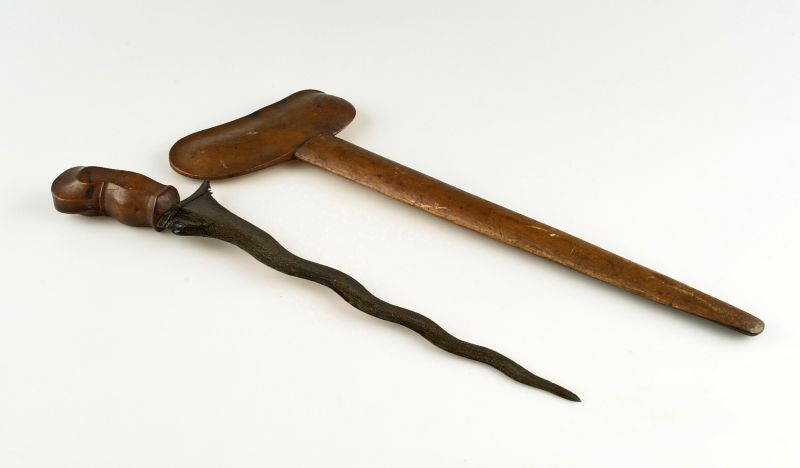
Keris

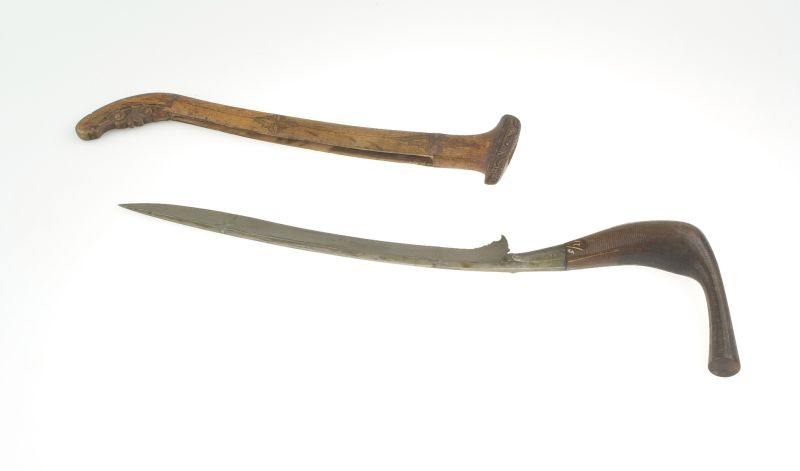
Rencong

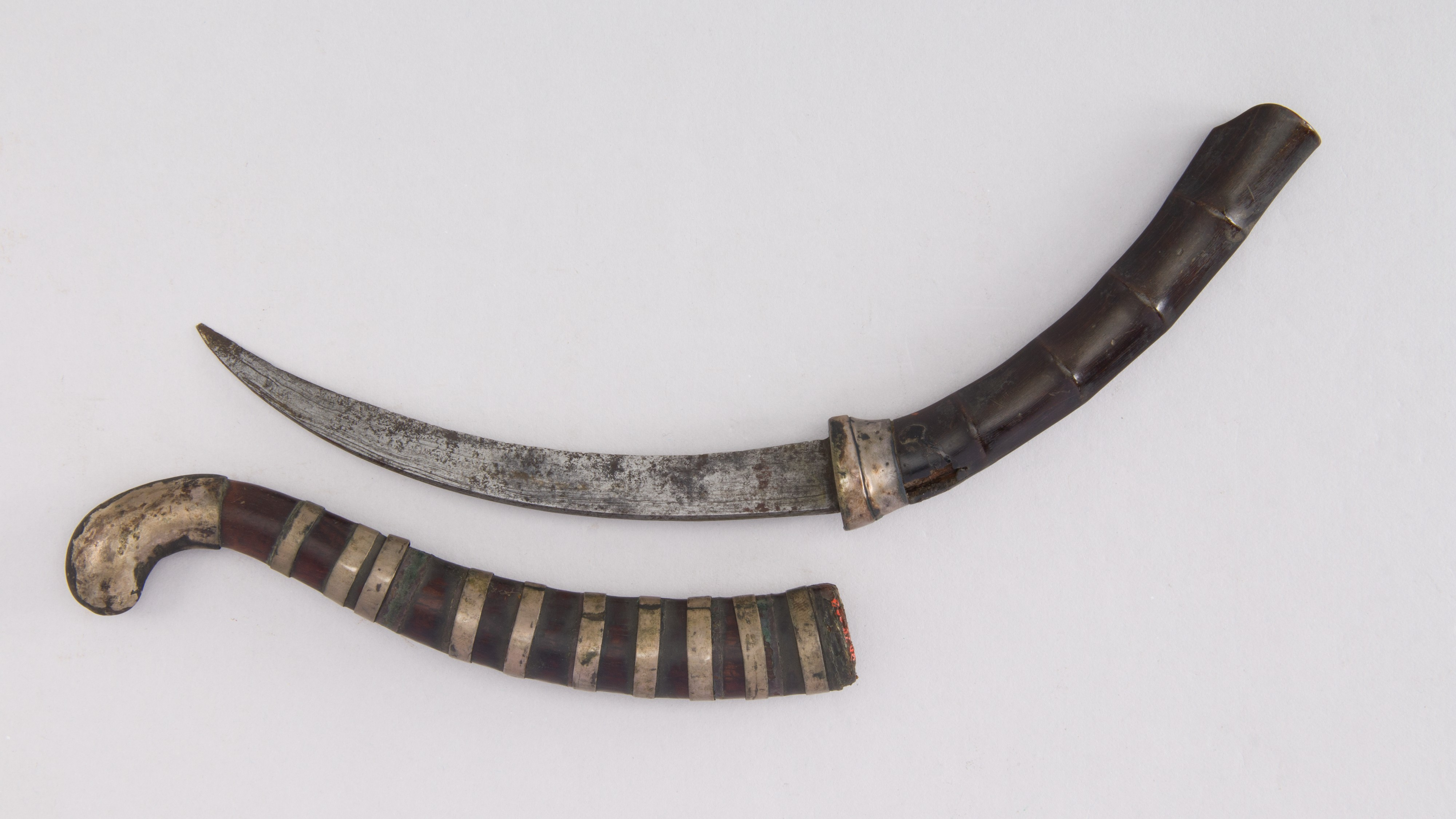
Karambit

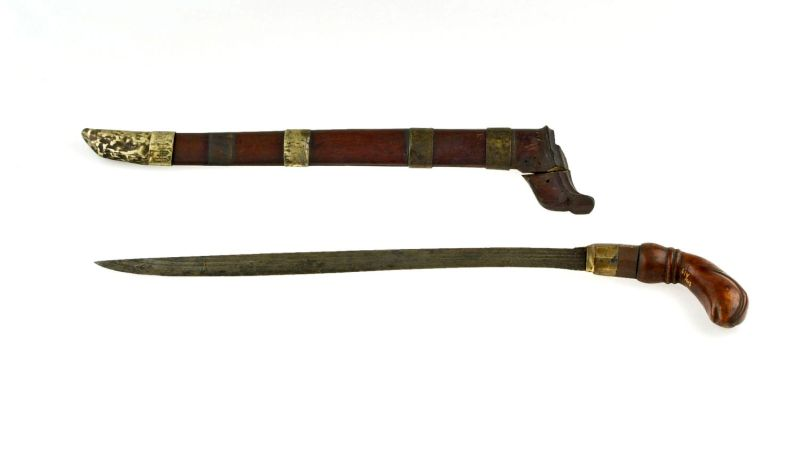
Badik

=== Digital Preservation of Traditional Indonesian Arts ===
Digital preservation has emerged as a pivotal strategy for safeguarding Indonesia's diverse and rich traditional arts. By integrating modern technology and participatory media practices, art forms such as gamelan music, Balinese dance, and wayang kulit are being preserved for future generations. Through digital archives, animation, and interactive platforms, these traditions are transcending geographical and temporal barriers, ensuring global reach and continued cultural relevance.

- Social Media Integration: Gamelan communities have utilized social media platforms like YouTube and Instagram to connect with global audiences, share performances, and foster cross-cultural appreciation. Community-led projects often host virtual workshops and live-stream performances, making traditional music accessible to younger and international audiences.
- Museum-Led Digital Archives: Institutions such as the Museum Mpu Tantular in East Java employ participatory media to document and preserve traditional performances. These efforts include creating digital exhibits and interactive platforms that educate and engage the public, particularly younger generations.
- Animated Cultural Storytelling: The animation series Si AA incorporates traditional gamelan music and folklore, presenting Indonesia's cultural heritage through a modern medium that resonates with international audiences. By blending traditional elements with contemporary storytelling, the series bridges cultural preservation and innovation.

== Clothing ==
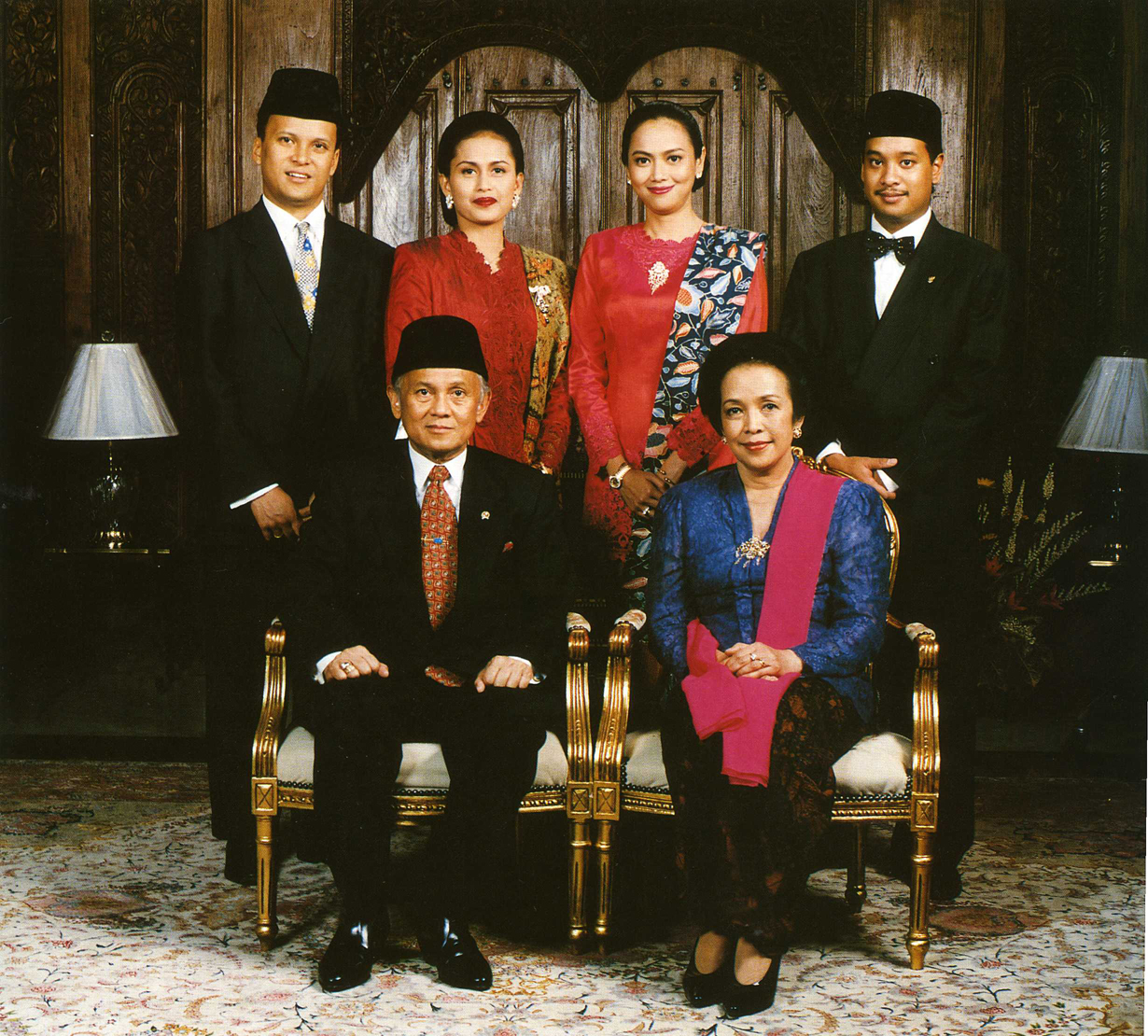
Formal family portrait of former Indonesian's President B.J. Habibie. Women wear kain batik and kebaya with selendang (sash), while men wear jas and dasi (western suit with tie) with peci cap.

Indonesia's best-known national costumes are Batik and kebaya, although initially these costumes originated mainly from Javanese and Balinese culture, which are most prominent in Javanese, Sundanese and Balinese cultures. Because Java has become the political centre and population of Indonesia, the island's folk costume has been raised to national status. As a plural country, Indonesia has 38 provinces, each of which has representatives of traditional clothing from each province with unique and different designs. National costumes are worn at official occasions and traditional ceremonies. each province in Indonesia – more complete each group in Indonesia, has its own traditional costumes. The costumes of this area are in Indonesian called Pakaian tradisional or Pakaian adat, and are taken from traditional Indonesian textile traditions and crafts.

=== National costumes ===
==== Batik Shirt ====
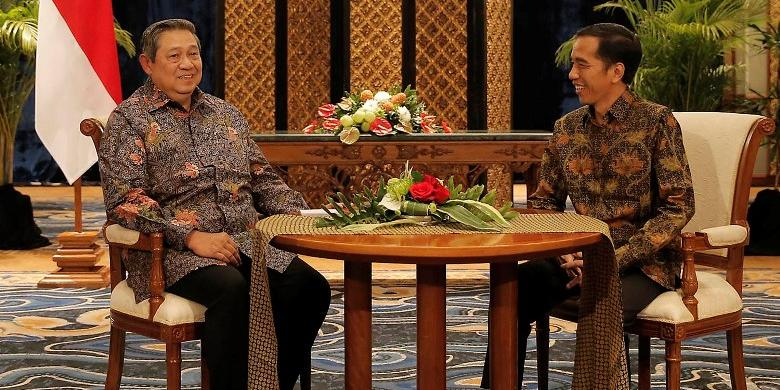
The batik shirt, as worn by the 7th Indonesian President Joko Widodo and the 6th Indonesian President Susilo Bambang Yudhoyono

Batik is a cloth that is traditionally made using a manual wax-resist dyeing technique to form intricate patterns. Traditionally batik cloth is a large piece of intricately decorated cloth used by Javanese women as kemben or torso wrap. Batik cloth was wrapped around the hips with multiple folds in front called wiron, while the upper torso wear kebaya fitted dress. Traditionally for men, the edge of batik cloth also can be sewn together to make a tubular cloth as sarong, or wrapped around hips as kain in a fashion similar to women's. Later for men, the batik cloth also is sewn and made into contemporary batik men's shirt. Today, Batik shirts, which are commonly worn by men in Indonesia (especially in Java), are usually worn during formal occasions; such as attending weddings, traditional ceremonies, formal meetings, communal gatherings, etc. Batik is recognized as one of the important identity of Indonesian culture. UNESCO designated Indonesian batik as a Masterpiece of Oral and Intangible Heritage of Humanity on 2 October 2009.

==== Kebaya ====
The kebaya is the national costume of women from Indonesia, although it is more accurately endemic to the Javanese, Sundanese and Balinese peoples. It is sometimes made from sheer material such as silk, thin cotton or semi-transparent nylon or polyester, adorned with brocade or floral pattern embroidery. Kebaya usually worn with a sarong or batik kain panjang, or other traditional woven garment such as ikat, songket with a colorful motif. Kebaya is usually worn during official national events by Indonesian first lady, wives of Indonesian diplomats, and Indonesian ladies. It also worn by Indonesian ladies attending traditional ceremonies and weddings. During Balinese traditional ceremonies, Balinese women wore colorful Balinese style kebaya with songket Bali.

=== Songket ===
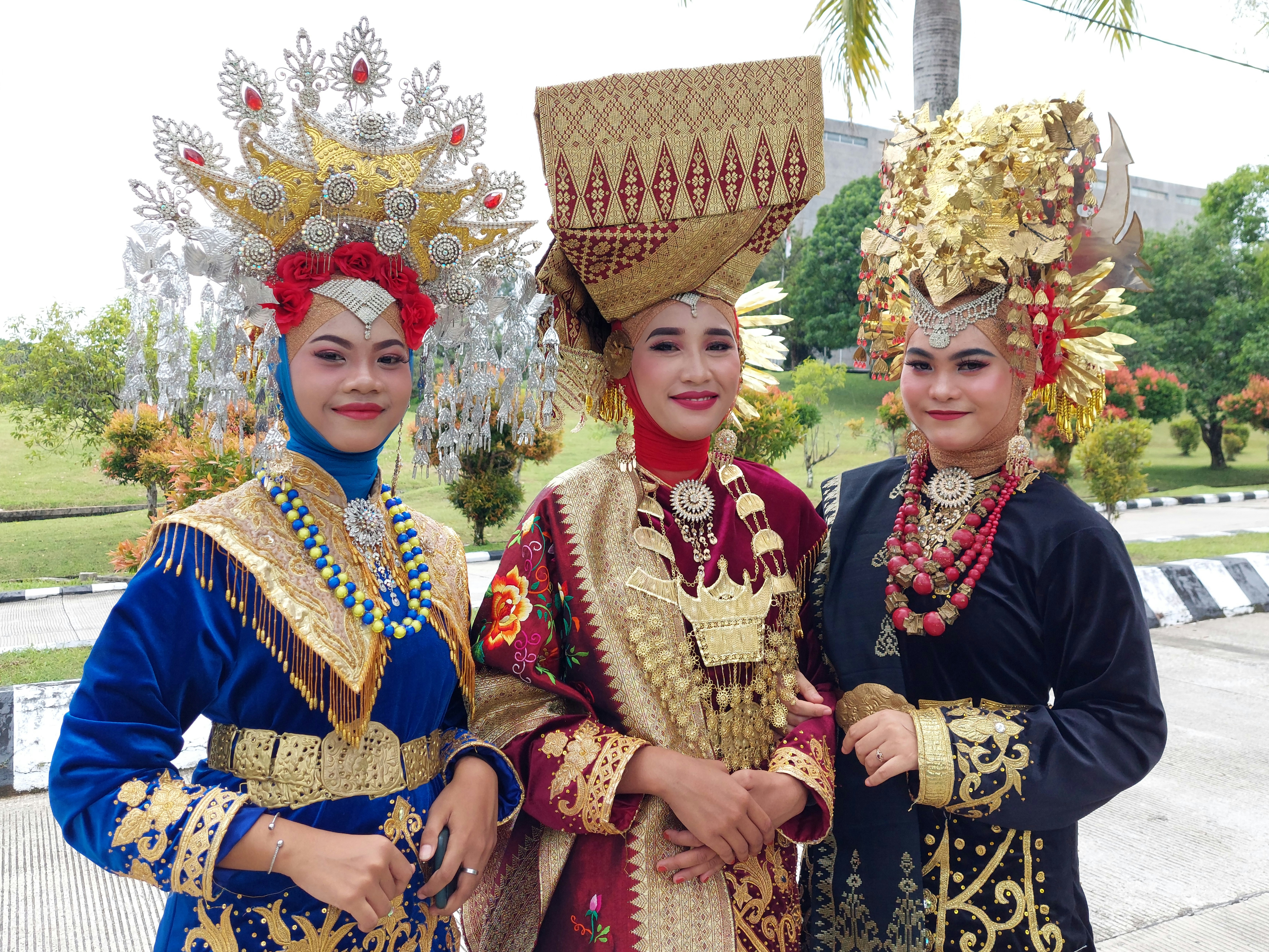
Minangkabau women in traditional attire, wearing Suntiang headdresses and Songket fabric decorated with gold accents, a distinctive feature of Sumatra's traditional dress.

Songket is a hand-woven in silk or cotton, and intricately patterned with gold or silver threads. In Indonesia, songket is more prevalent in Sumatra and Lesser Sunda Islands (Bali, Lombok and Sumbawa), while in Java, batik is more popular. Various songket patterns are traditionally produced in Sumatra, Kalimantan, Bali, Sulawesi, Lombok and Sumbawa. In Sumatra the famous songket production centres are in Minangkabau Pandai Sikek area, West Sumatra, Jambi City. Jambi and Palembang, South Sumatra. In Bali, songket production villages can be found in Klungkung regency, especially at Sidemen and Gelgel. In the neighbouring island of Lombok, the Sukarara village in Jonggat district, Central Lombok regency, is famous for songket making.

==== Peci ====
The Peci, also known as songkok or kopiah, is a cap traditionally worn by male Muslims in the Indonesian archipelago. It is quite similar to the Turkish-Egyptian fez. In Indonesia, the black velvet peci has become the national headdress with nationalist connotations made popular by Sukarno. A number of Indonesian nationalist movement activists in the early 20th century, wore a peci to convey their nationalistic sentiments and to demonstrate their Indonesian identity. Indonesian male presidents always wear a peci as part of their official presidential attire. Since then, the black velvet peci is approved to be the national head-dress for Indonesian men. It is worn all over Indonesia, especially by government officials and men (usually Muslim men) throughout the country. The peci is usually worn with a batik shirt or western-style suits by men in Indonesia for those attending formal occasions.

Some traditional clothes in Indonesia

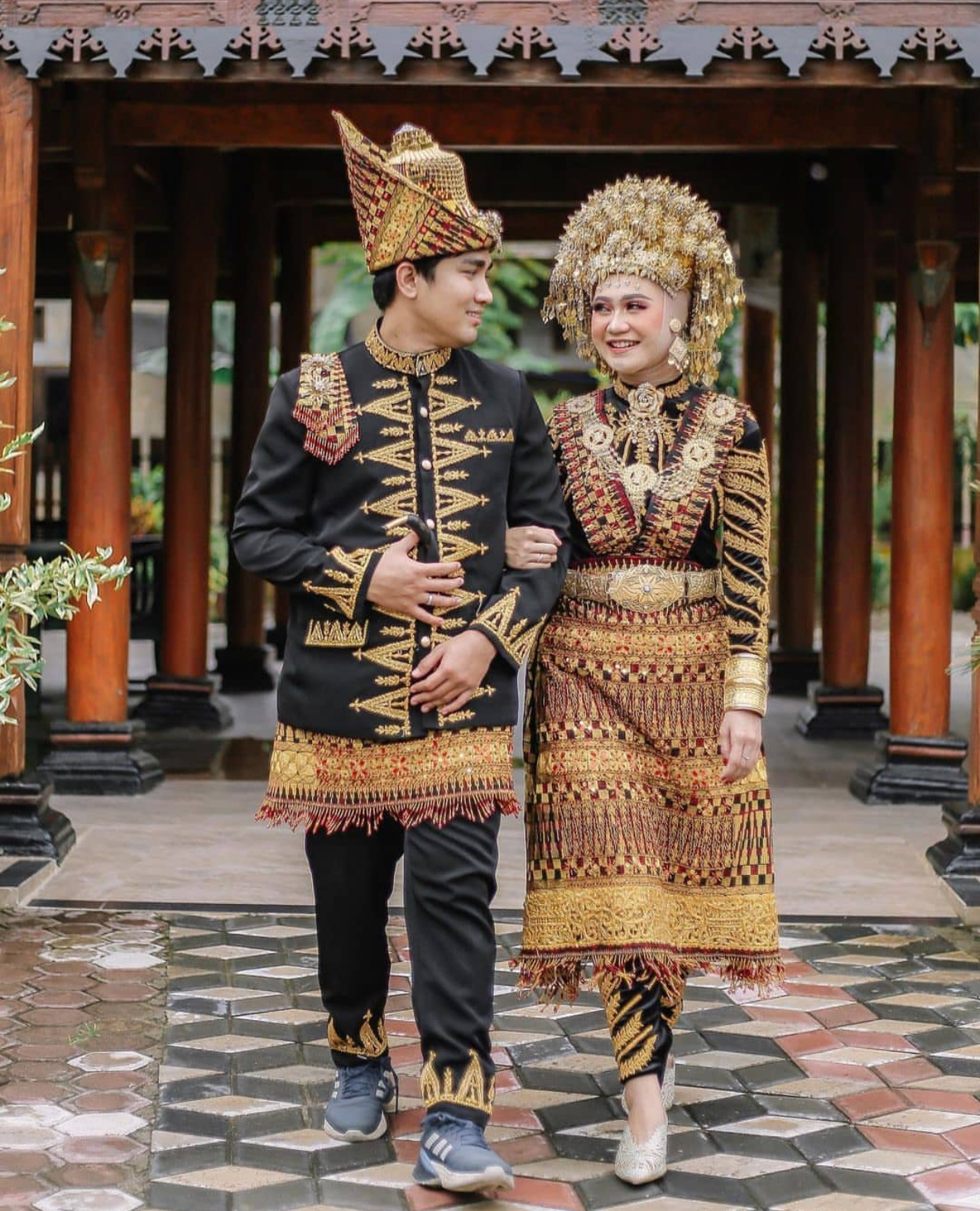
Acehnese

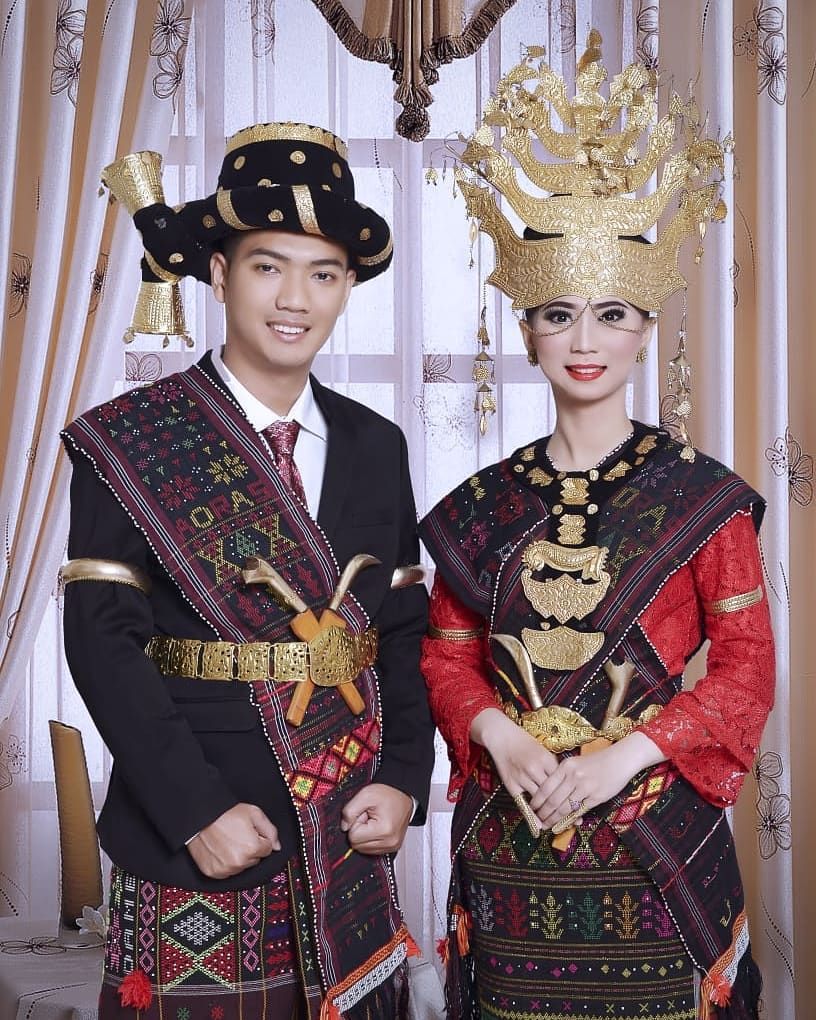
Batak

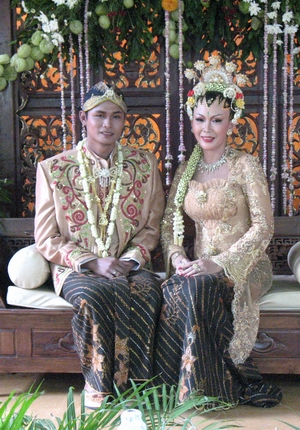
Javanese

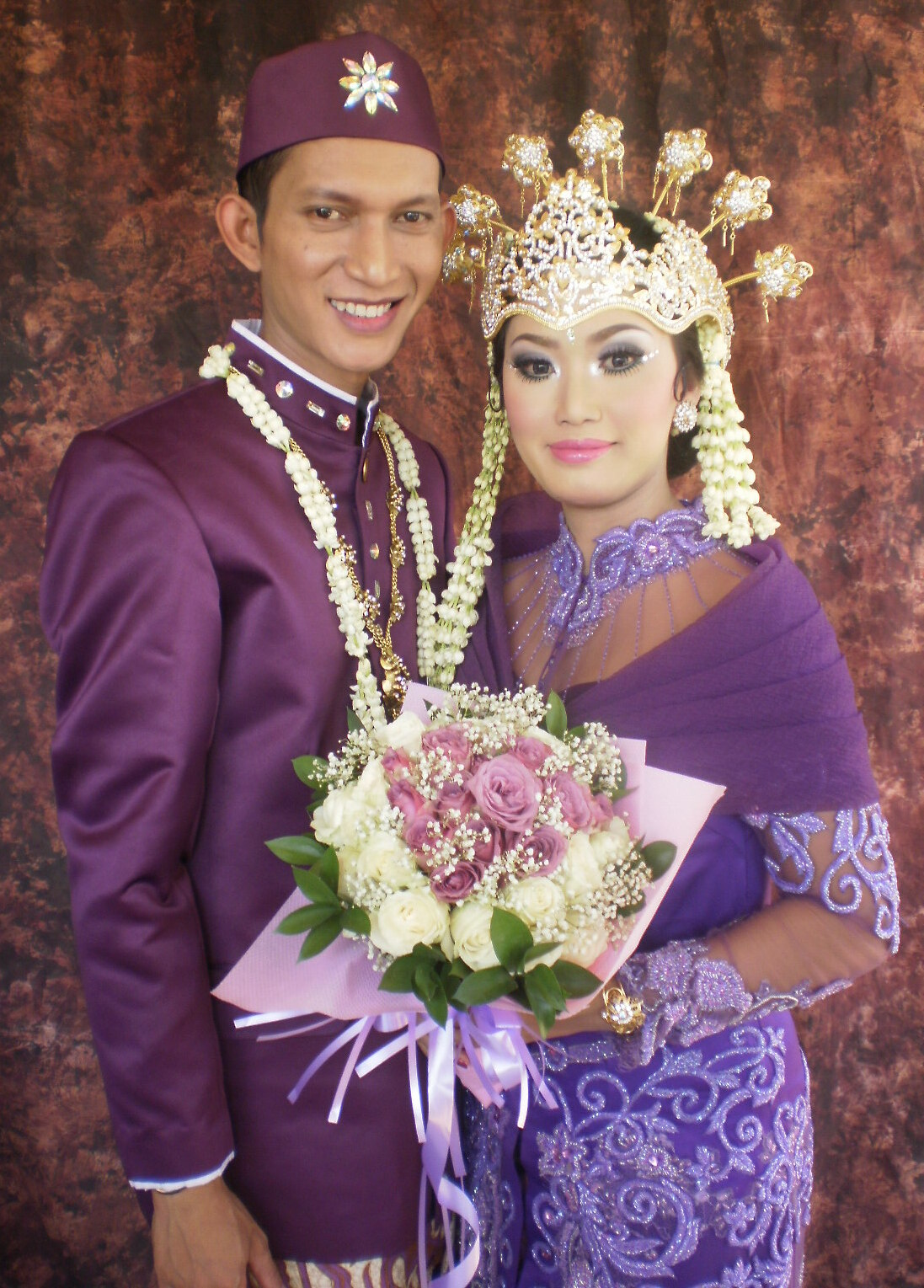
Sundanese

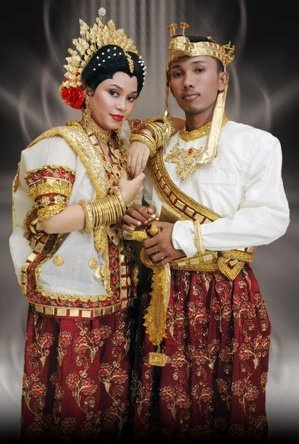
Buginese

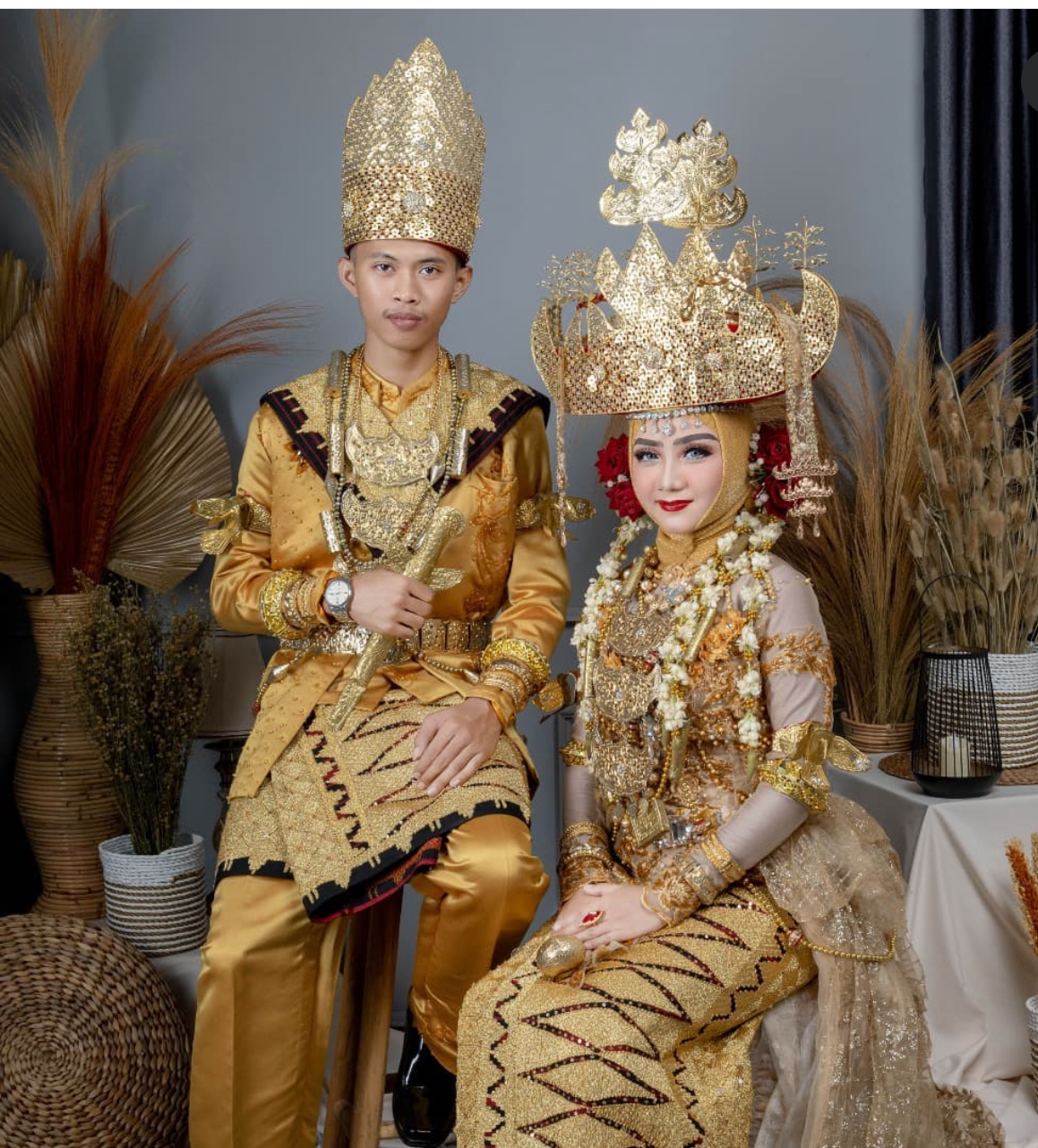
Lampungese

== Foods ==
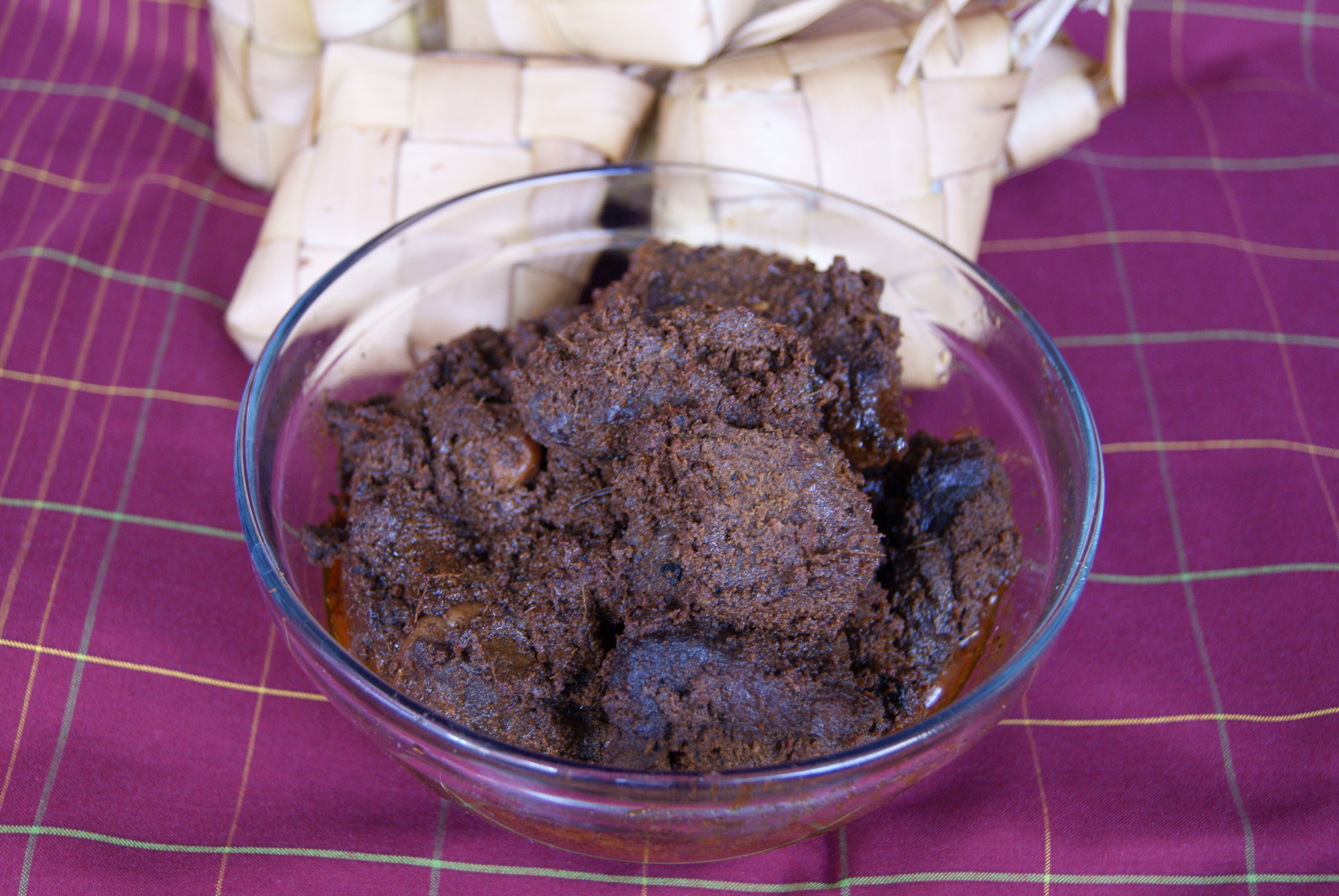
In 2011 an online poll by 35,000 people held by CNN International chose Rendang as the number one dish of their 'World's 50 Most Delicious Foods' list.

The cuisine of indonesia has been influenced by Chinese culture and Indian culture, as well as by Western culture. However, in return, Indonesian cuisine has also contributed to the cuisines of neighbouring countries, notably Malaysia, Singapore, and Brunei, where Padang or Minangkabau cuisine from West Sumatra is very popular. Also, Satay (Sate in Indonesian), which originated from Java, Madura, and Sumatra, has gained popularity as a street vendor food from Singapore to Thailand. In the 15th century, both the Portuguese and Arab traders arrived in Indonesia with the intention of trading for pepper and other spices. During the colonial era, immigrants from many countries arrived in Indonesia and brought different cultures as well as cuisines.

Most native Indonesians eat rice as the main dish, with a wide range of vegetables and meat as side dishes. However, in some parts of the country, such as Papua and Ambon, the majority of the people eat sago (a type of tapioca) and sweet potato.

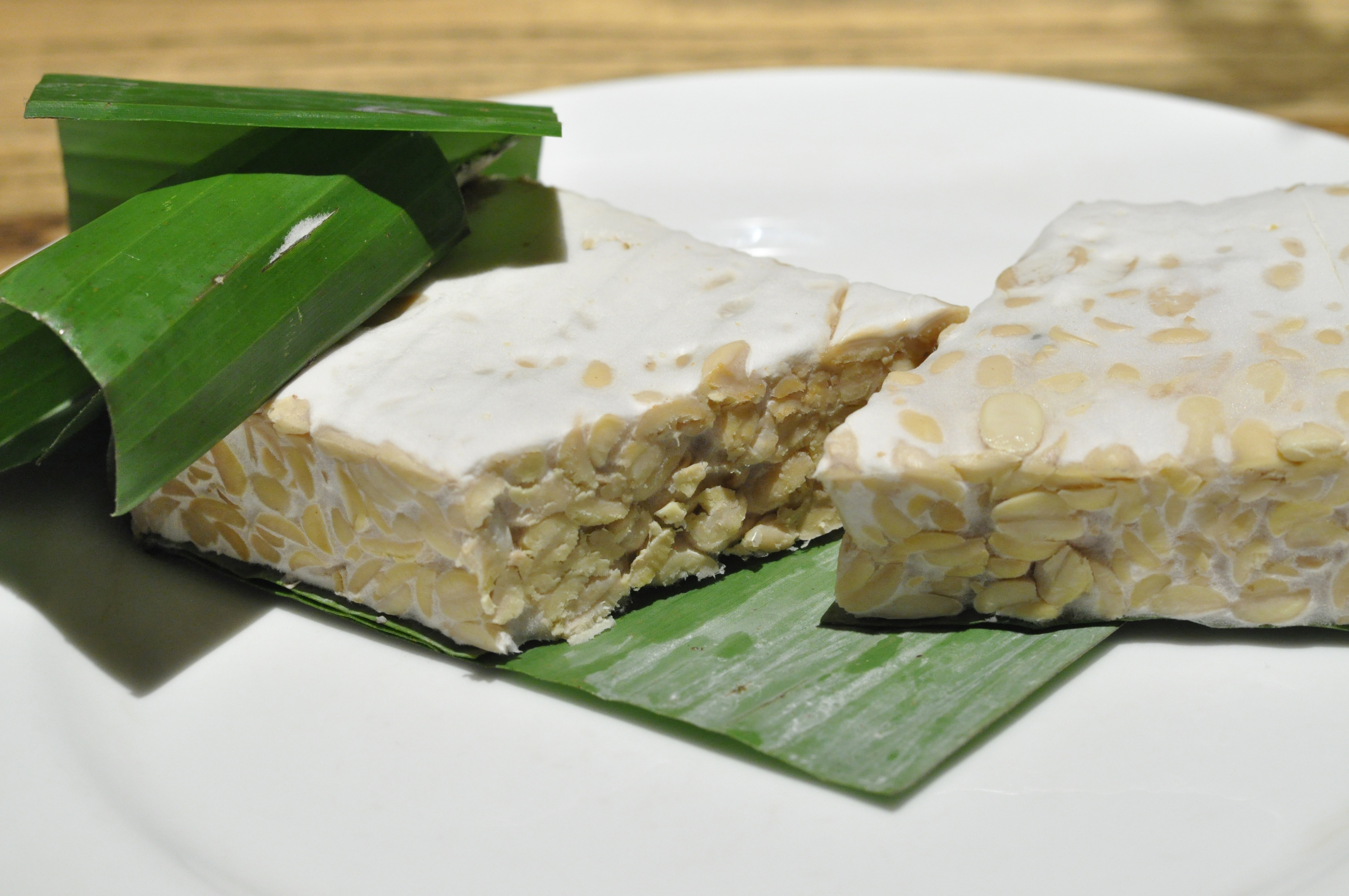
Tempe, is an Indonesian fermented food made from soybeans

Indonesian dishes are usually spicy, using a wide range of chilli peppers and spices. The most popular dishes include nasi goreng (fried rice), Satay, Nasi Padang (a dish of Minangkabau) and soy-based dishes, such as tahu and tempe. A unique characteristic of some Indonesian food is the application of spicy peanut sauce in their dishes, as a dressing for Gado-gado or Karedok (Indonesian style salad), or for seasoning grilled chicken satay. Another unique aspect of Indonesian cuisine is using terasi or belacan, a pungent shrimp paste in dishes of sambal oelek (hot pungent chilli sauce). The sprinkling of fried shallots also gives a uniquely crisp texture to some Indonesian dishes.

Chinese and Indian cultures have influenced the serving of food and the types of spices used. It is very common to find Chinese food in Indonesia such as dimsum and noodles, and Indian cuisine such as Tandoori chicken. In addition, Western culture has significantly contributed to the extensive range of dishes. However, the dishes have been transformed to suit Indonesian tastes. For example, steaks are usually served with rice. Popular fast foods such as Kentucky Fried Chicken are served with rice instead of bread and sambal (spicy sauce) instead of ketchup. Some Indonesian foods have been adopted by the Dutch, like Indonesian rice table or 'rijsttafel'.

In 2023/2024, TasteAtlas rated Indonesian cuisine as the sixth best cuisine in the world. Indonesian cuisine is placed behind Italian, Japanese, Greek, Portuguese, and Chinese cuisines, making Indonesian the best-rated cuisine in Southeast Asia.

Some national dishes of Indonesia

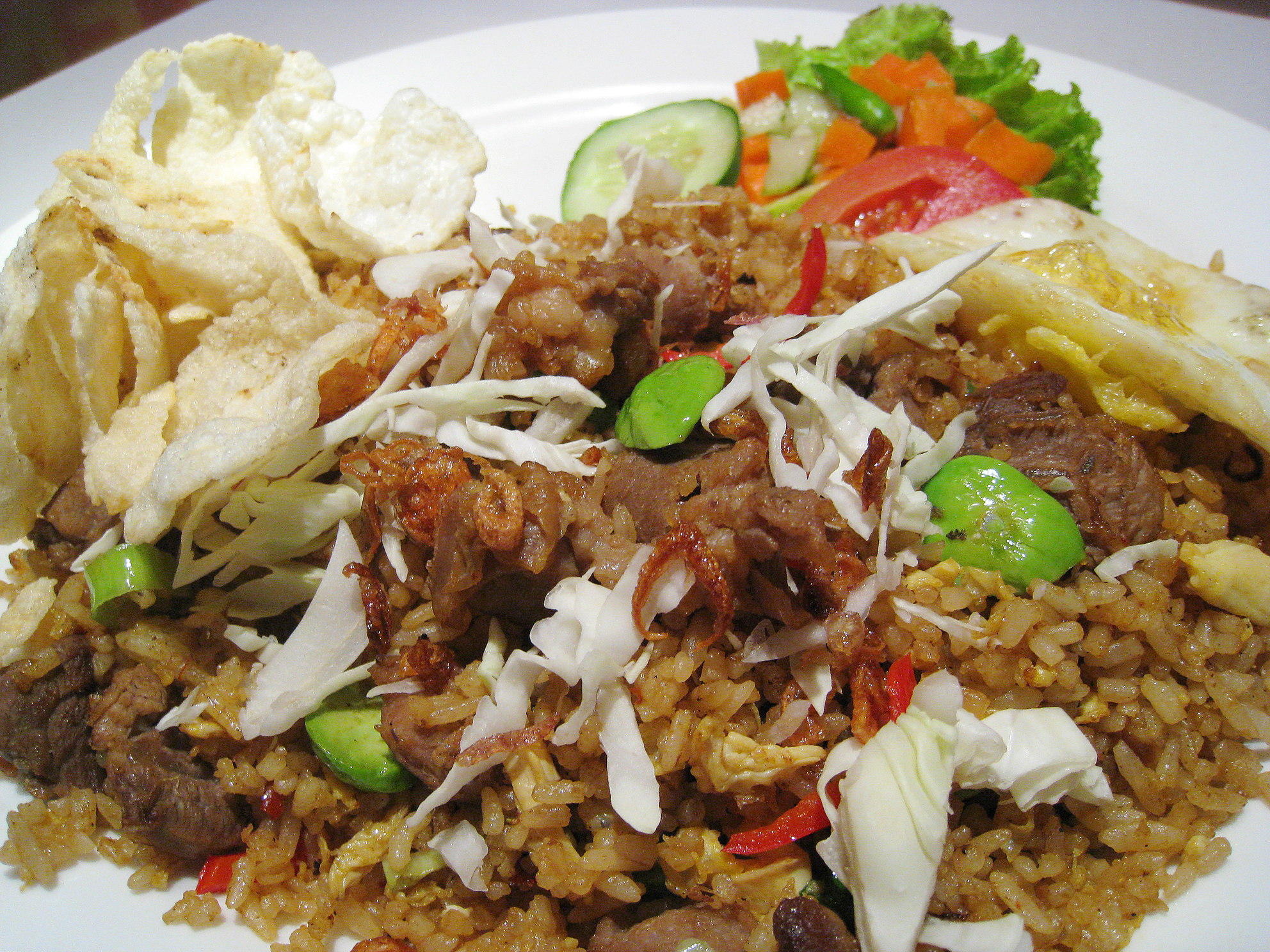
Nasi Goreng, a classic Indonesian fried rice dish, cooked with vegetables, meat, and bumbu (seasoning).

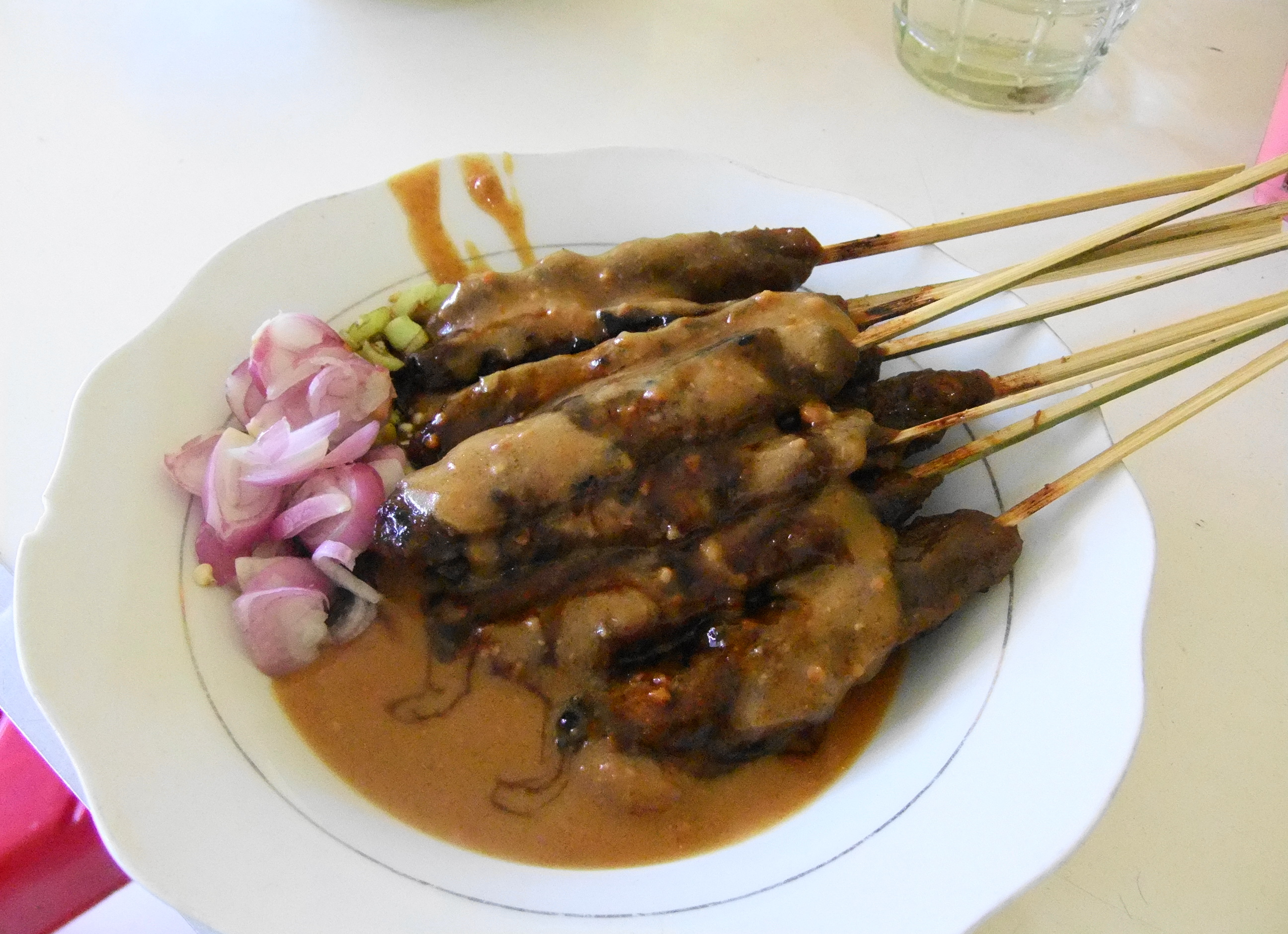
Sate, a popular Indonesian dish featuring skewered and grilled meat, served with a savoury peanut sauce. Originating from Java, its popularity has increased across Southeast Asia.

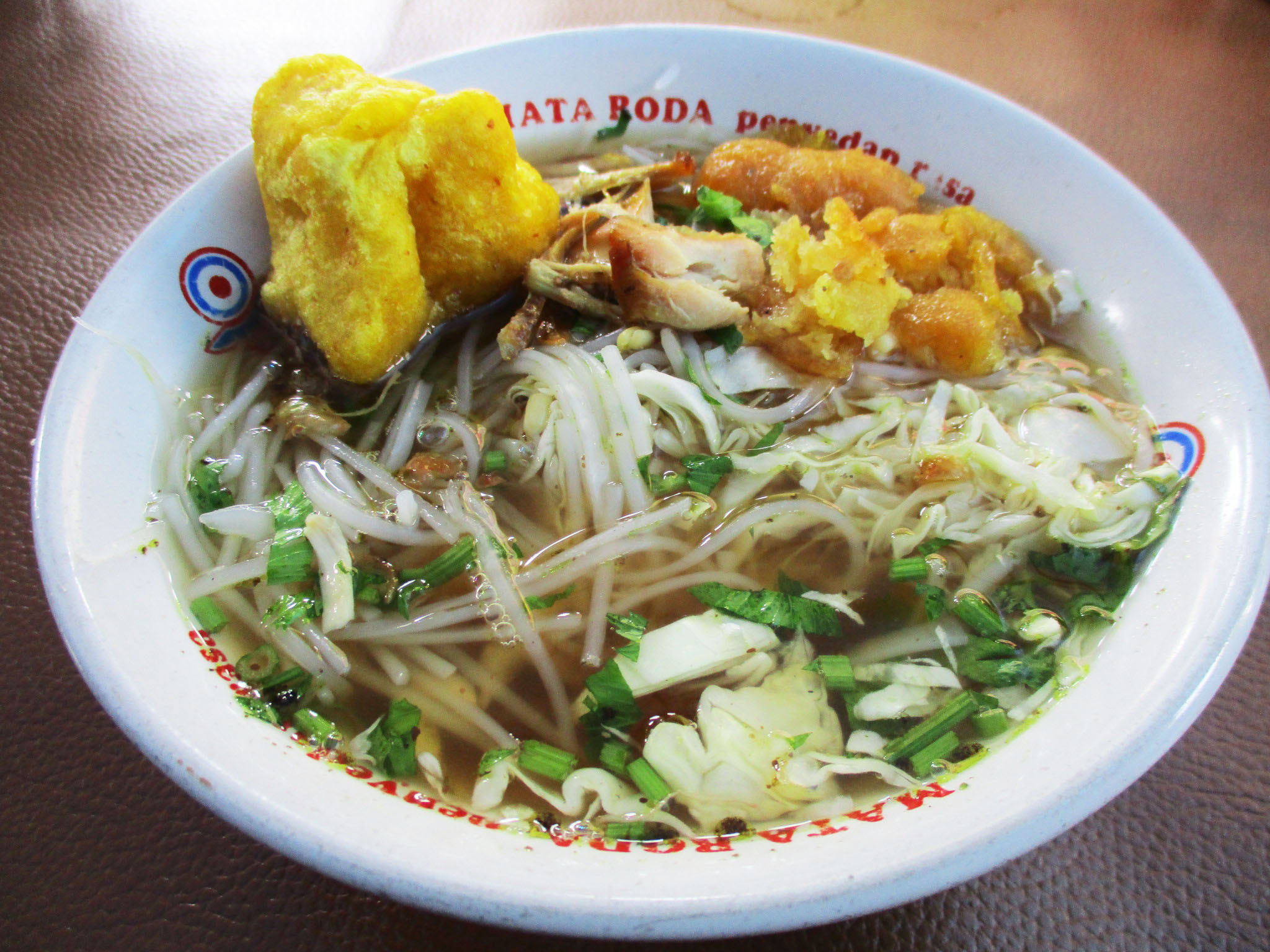
Soto, a traditional soup made with rich broth, tender meat, and fresh vegetables, often served with rice and various toppings.

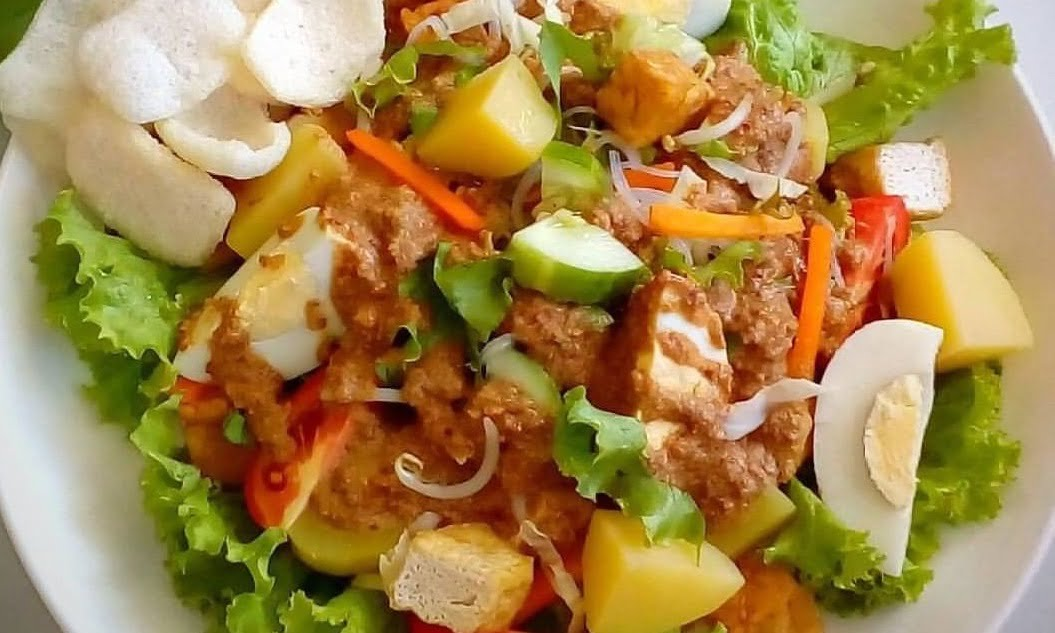
Gado-gado, A traditional Indonesian salad with a mix of fresh vegetables, tofu, and tempeh, all topped with peanut sauce.

== Mythology and folklores ==
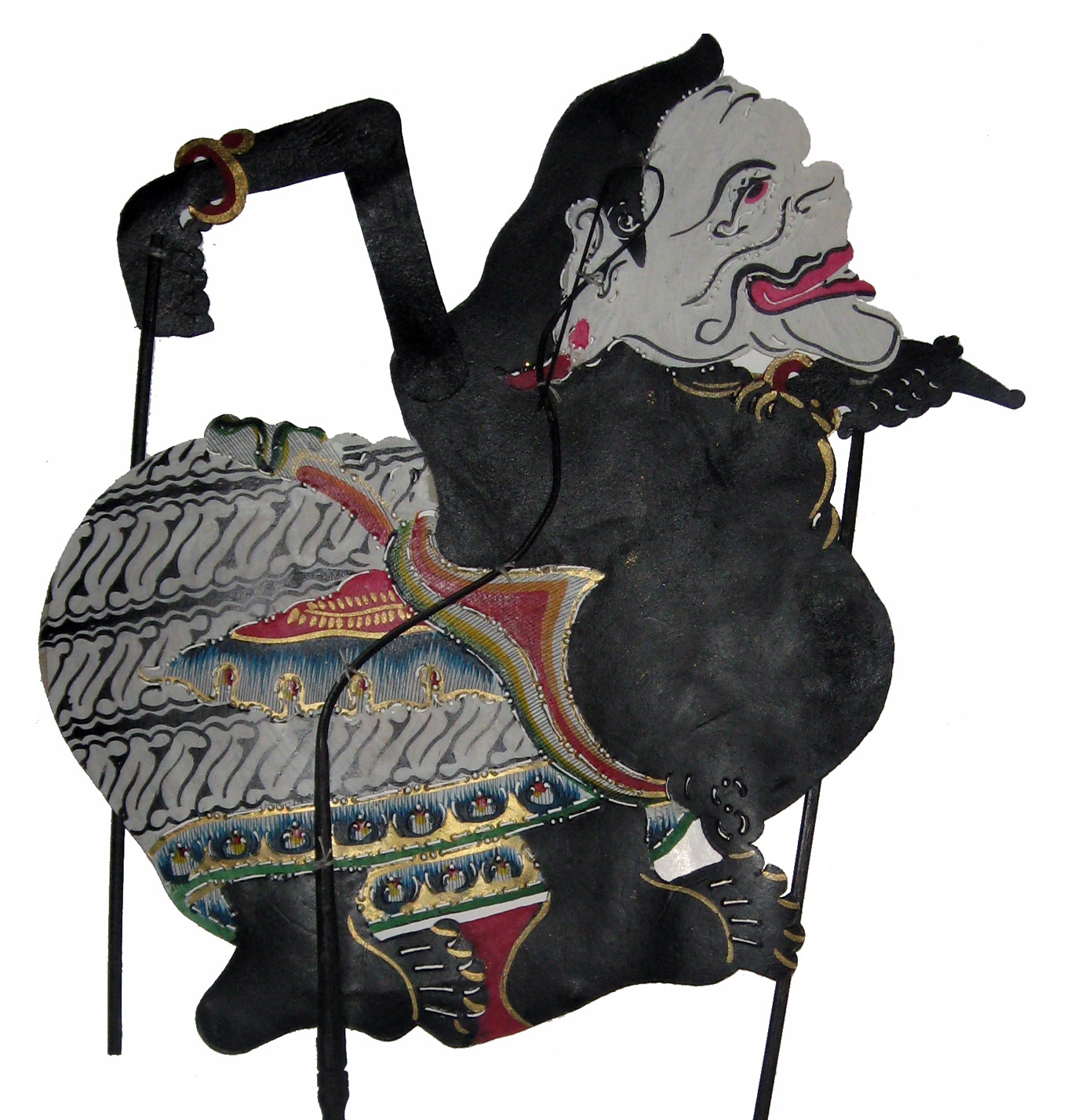
Semar, a guardian figure in Javanese mythology, is believed to return to the Nusantara every 500 years to restore balance and justice

The mythology of Indonesia is very diverse, the Indonesian people consisting of hundreds of ethnic groups, each with their own myths and legends. The stories within this system of lore often incorporate supernatural entities and magical creatures which form parts of Indonesian mythology. Others relate to creation myths and place naming legends that are often intertwined with historical figures and events. Ancient rituals for healing and traditional medicine as well as complex philosophies regarding health and disease can also be found.

These native mythologies are relatively free from foreign influences, such as Torajans, Nias, Bataks, Dayaks and Papuans. By contrast, Javanese, Balinese, and to some degree Sundanese were influenced by Hindu-Buddhist Indian mythology as early as the 1st century CE. Hindu gods, legends and epics such as Ramayana and Mahabharata were adopted and adapted into a uniquely local form.

Hindu-Buddhist mythical beings have a role in Javanese and Balinese mythology, including Hindu gods and heroes, devatas, asuras, apsaras (known as hapsari or bidadari), kinnaras, etc., while native gods of nature such as Semar, Dewi Sri, and Nyai Loro Kidul are either given identified as their Hindu counterpart or incorporated into a Java-Bali Hindu pantheon unknown in India. For example, native rice goddess Dewi Sri is identified with Lakshmi the shakti of Vishnu, and Semar and his sons the Punakawans are incorporated into the epic of Mahabharata in Javanese wayang kulit, as the clown servants of the Pandawas. Several names refer to gods, such as Dewa (devas), Dewi (devi), dewata (devatas), and in native traditions usually referred to as Batara (male god) and Batari (female goddess).

After the coming of Islam to the Indonesian archipelago, Islamic mythology especially those dealing with spiritual beings, such as devils, demons, jinns and angels entered Indonesian mythology. In Sumatra, Malay, Aceh and Minangkabau mythology was almost entirely supplanted by Islamic mythology. However, belief in local spirits such as the forest guardian, the ghost of water or haunted places still exists, often associated with a jinn or the tormented soul of a deceased human.

Some Indonesian Traditional Sports

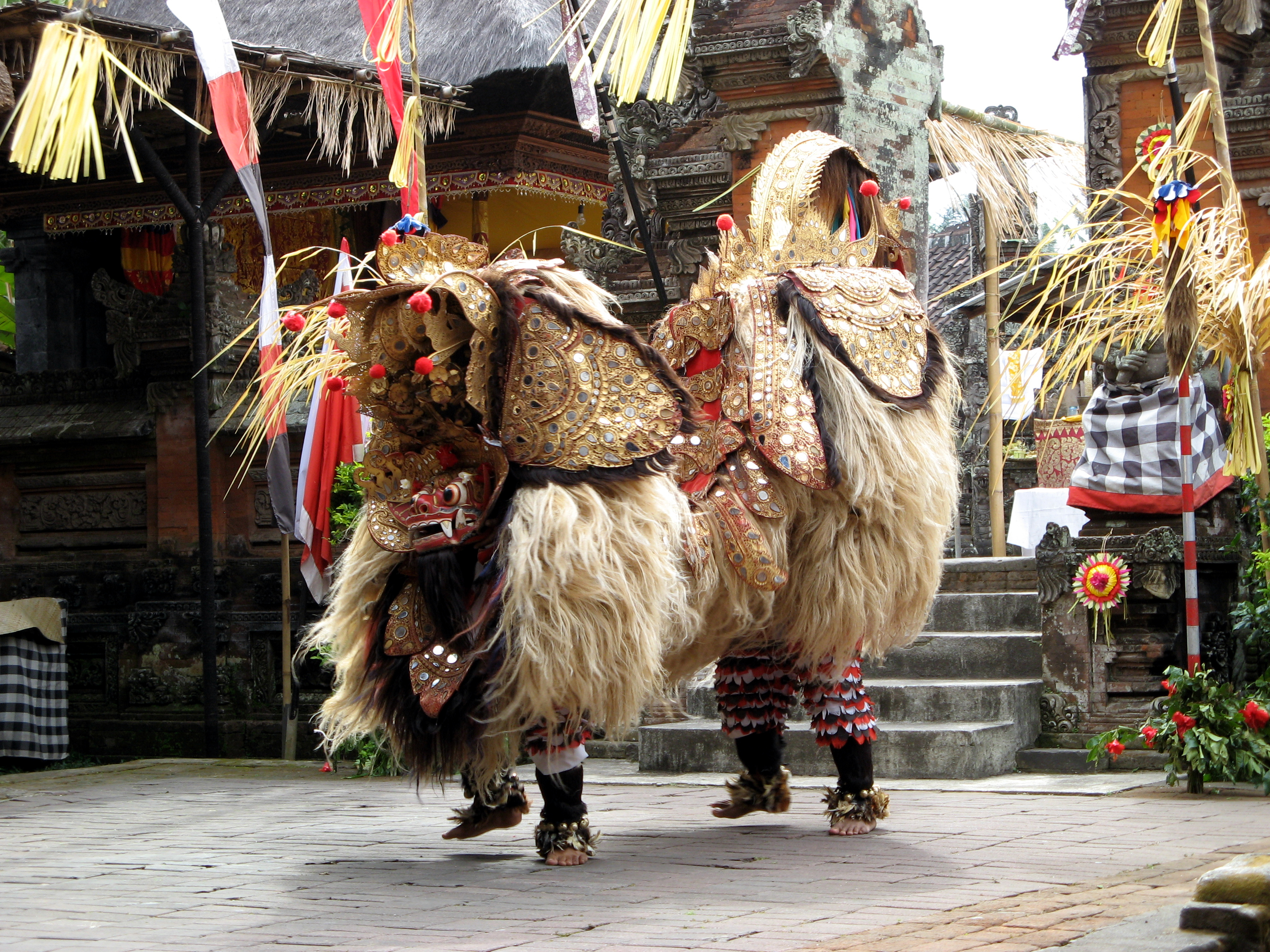
Barong

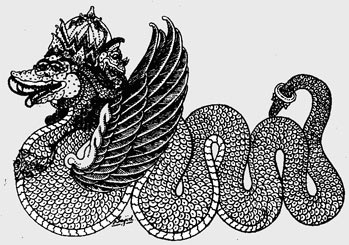
Antaboga

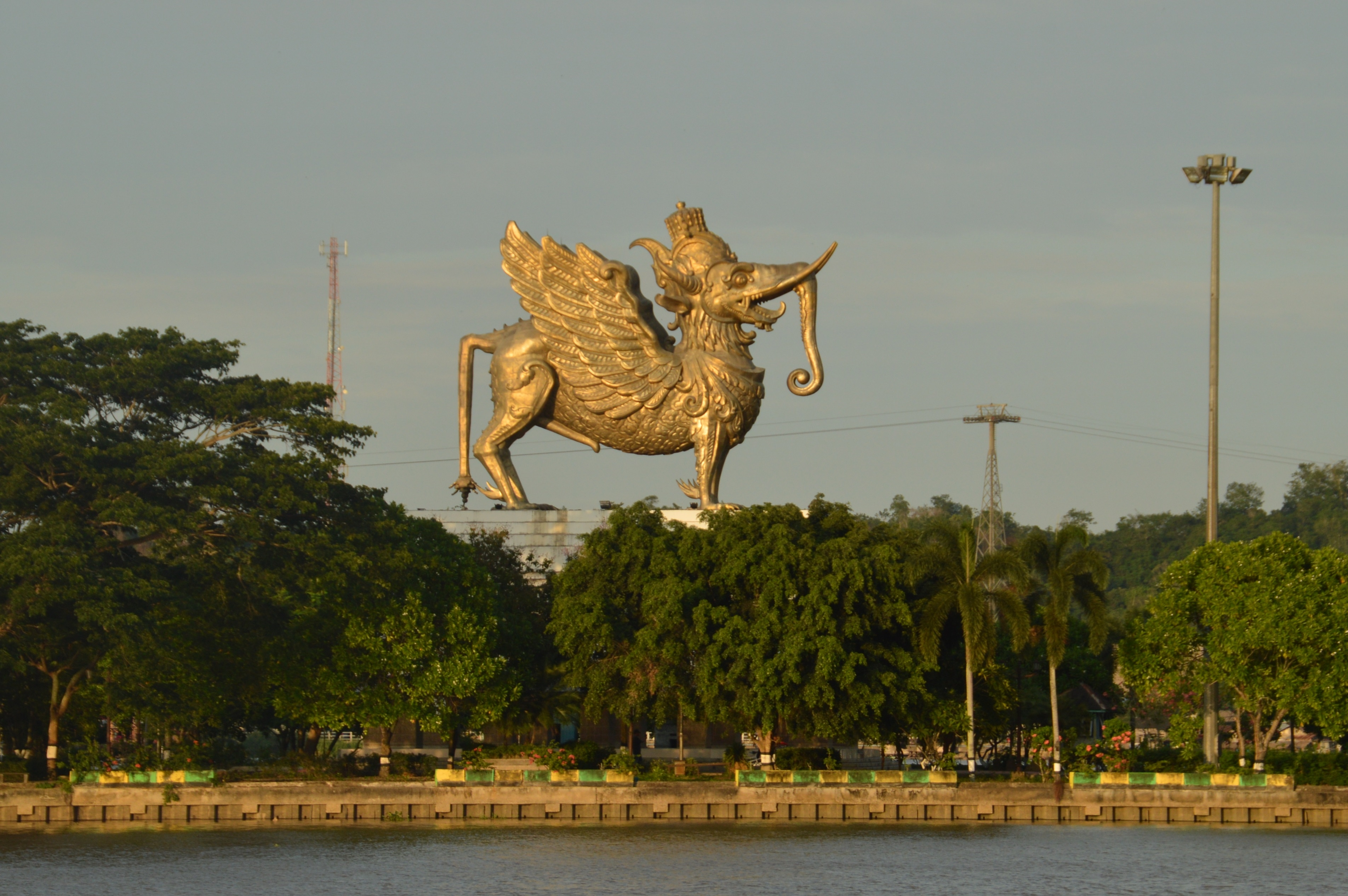
Lembuswana

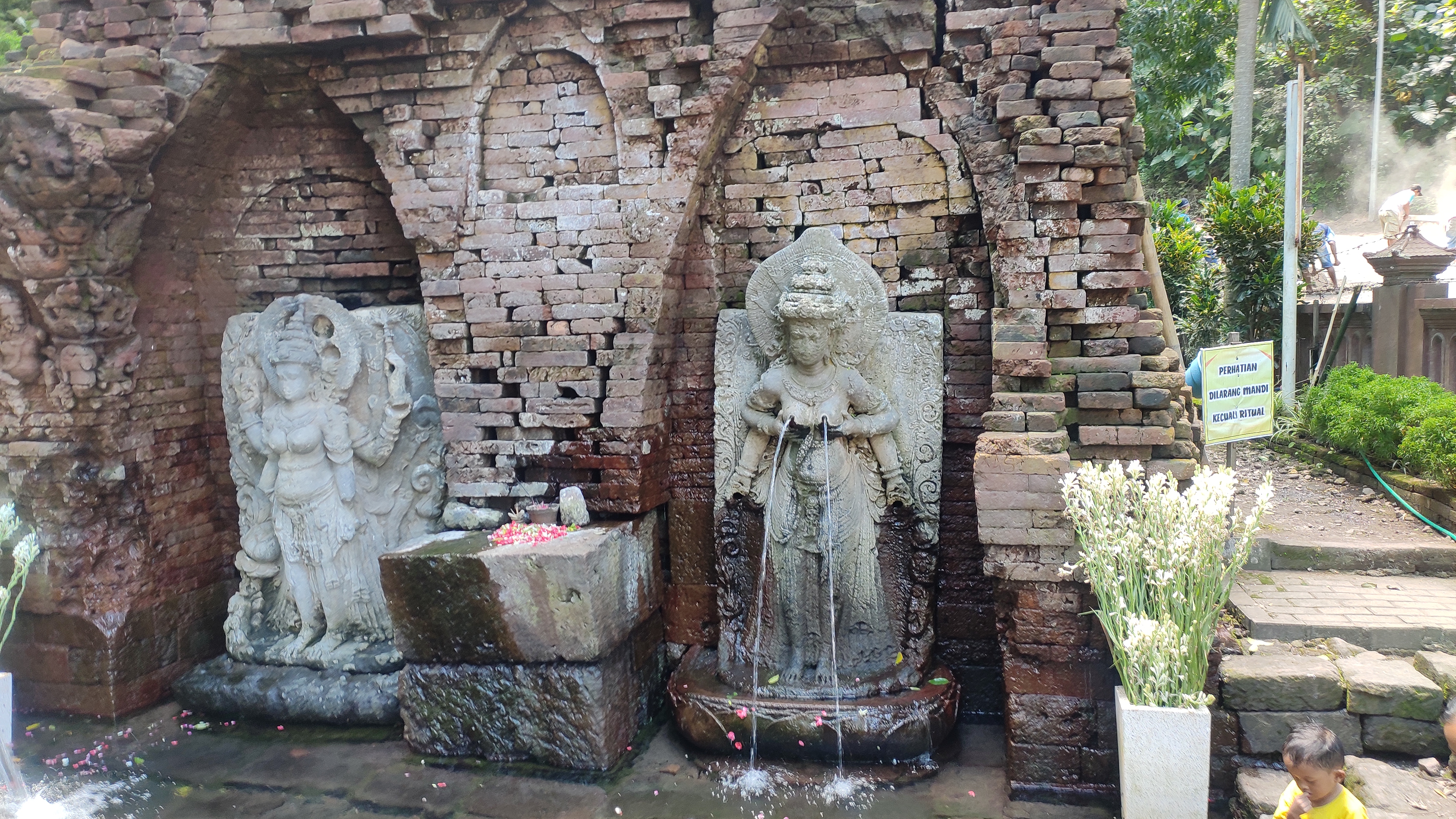
Dewi Sri

== Literature ==
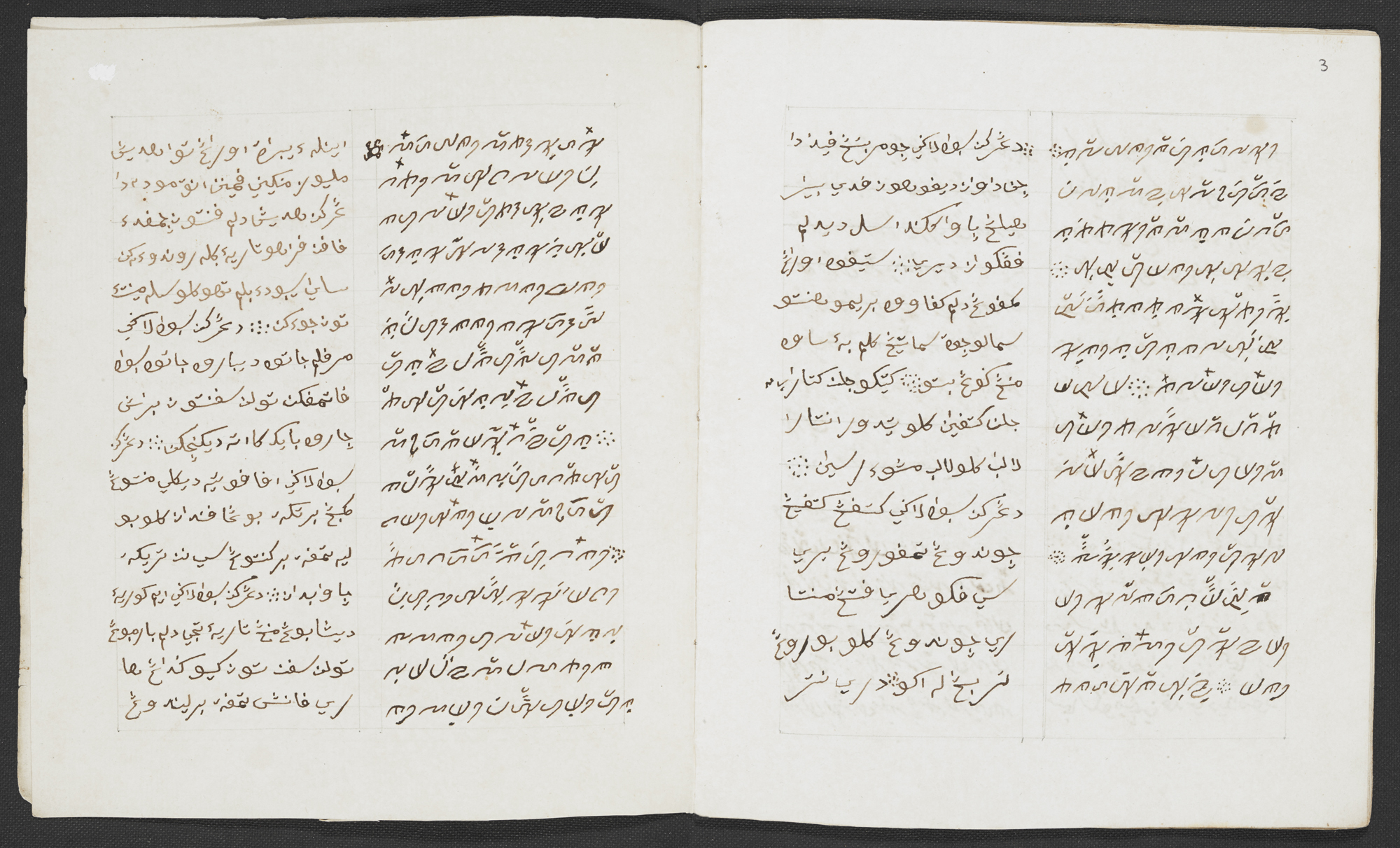
A Pantun writing using the Jawi script.

Early Indonesian literature originates in Malay literature, and the influence of these roots was felt until well into the twentieth century. The phrase "Indonesian literature" refers to Indonesian as written in the nation of Indonesia, but also covers literature written in an earlier form of the language, i.e. the Malay language written in the Dutch East Indies. Pramoedya Ananta Toer was Indonesia's most internationally celebrated author, having won the Magsaysay Award as well as being considered for the Nobel Prize in Literature. Other important figures include the late Chairil Anwar, a poet and member of the "Generation 45" group of authors who were active in the Indonesian independence movement. Tight information controls during Suharto's presidency suppressed new writing, especially because of its ability to agitate for social reform.

In the book Max Havelaar, Dutch author Multatuli criticised the Dutch treatment of the Indonesians, which gained him international attention.

Modern Indonesian authors include Seno Gumira Adjidarma, Andrea Hirata, Habiburrahman El Shirazy, Ayu Utami, Gus tf Sakai, Eka Kurniawan, Ratih Kumala, Dee, Oka Rusmini. Some of their works have translated to other languages.

Poetry has a long tradition in Indonesia, particularly among ethnically Malay populations, of extemporary, interactive, oral composition of poetry. These poems are referred to as pantun. Contemporary Indonesian poets include among others, Sutardji Calzoum Bachri, Rendra, Taufiq Ismail, Afrizal Malna, Binhad Nurrohmat, Joko Pinurbo, Nyoman Tusthi Eddy, and Sapardi Djoko Damono. In written poetry and prose, a number of traditional forms dominate, mainly: syair (traditional narrative poetry), gurindam (brief aphorisms), hikayat (stories, fairy-tales, animal fables, chronicles), babad (histories or chronicles).

On 15 December 2020 the Pantun is recognized as a Masterpiece of the Oral and Intangible Heritage of Humanity by UNESCO (United Nations Educational, Scientific and Cultural Organization).

== Recreation and sports ==
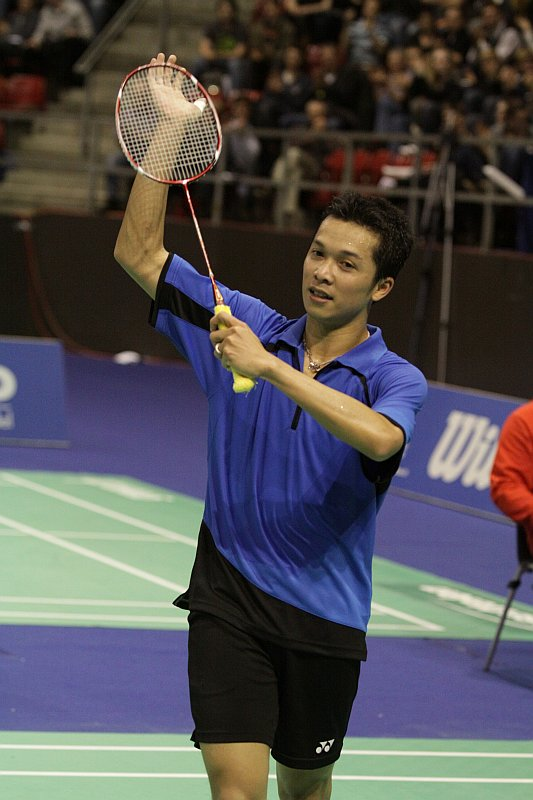
Taufik Hidayat, 2004 Olympic gold medalist in badminton men's singles.

Many traditional games are still preserved and popular in Indonesia, although western culture has influenced some parts of them. Among three hundred officially recognised Indonesian cultures, there are many kinds of traditional games: cockfighting in Bali, annual bull races in Madura, horse racing in Sumbawa and stone jumping in Nias. Stone jumping involves leaping over a stone wall about up to 1.5 m high and was originally used to train warriors. Pencak Silat is another popular form of sport, which was influenced by Asian culture as a whole. Another form of national sport is sepak takraw. The rules are similar to volleyball: to keep the rattan ball in the air with the players' feet.

Popular modern sports in Indonesia played at the international level include football (soccer), badminton and basketball. Badminton is one of Indonesia's most successful sports. Indonesian badminton athletes have played in Indonesia Open Badminton Championship, All England Open Badminton Championships, and many international events, including the Summer Olympics and won Olympic gold medals since badminton was made an Olympic sport in 1992. Rudy Hartono is a legendary Indonesian badminton player, who won All England titles seven times in a row (1968 through 1974). Indonesian teams have won the Thomas Cup (men's world team championship) thirteen of the twenty-two times that it has been contested since they entered the series in 1957. In the internationally popular sport of football (soccer), Indonesian teams have been active in the Asian Football Confederation (AFC).

Sporting events in Indonesia are organised by the National Sports Committee of Indonesia (KONI). The committee, along with the government of Indonesia, has set a National Sports Day every 9 September with "Sports for All" as the motto. Indonesia has hosted the Southeast Asian Games four times, in 1979, 1987, 1997 and 2011, and won the overall champion title in each of these years. As of 2011, Indonesia has won champion titles 10 times overall out of 18 SEA Games it has attended since debuted in 1977. The country also hosted the 1993 Asian Basketball Championship. Besides that, it has also hosted the Asian Games twice, the 1962 Asian Games and the 2018 Asian Games.

Some Indonesian Traditional Sports

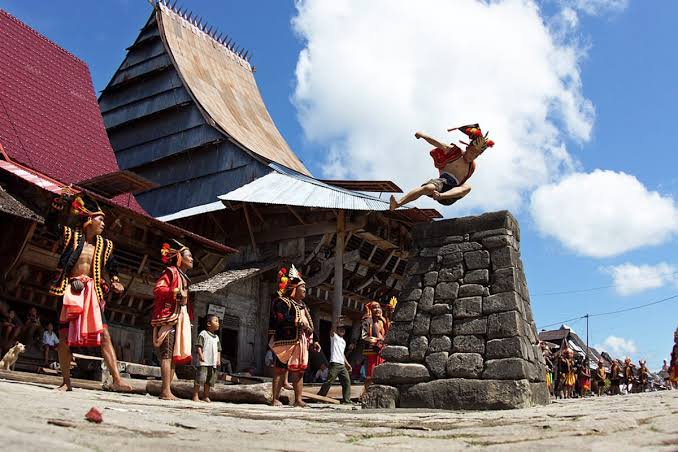
Hombo Batu in South Nias Regency, North Sumatra

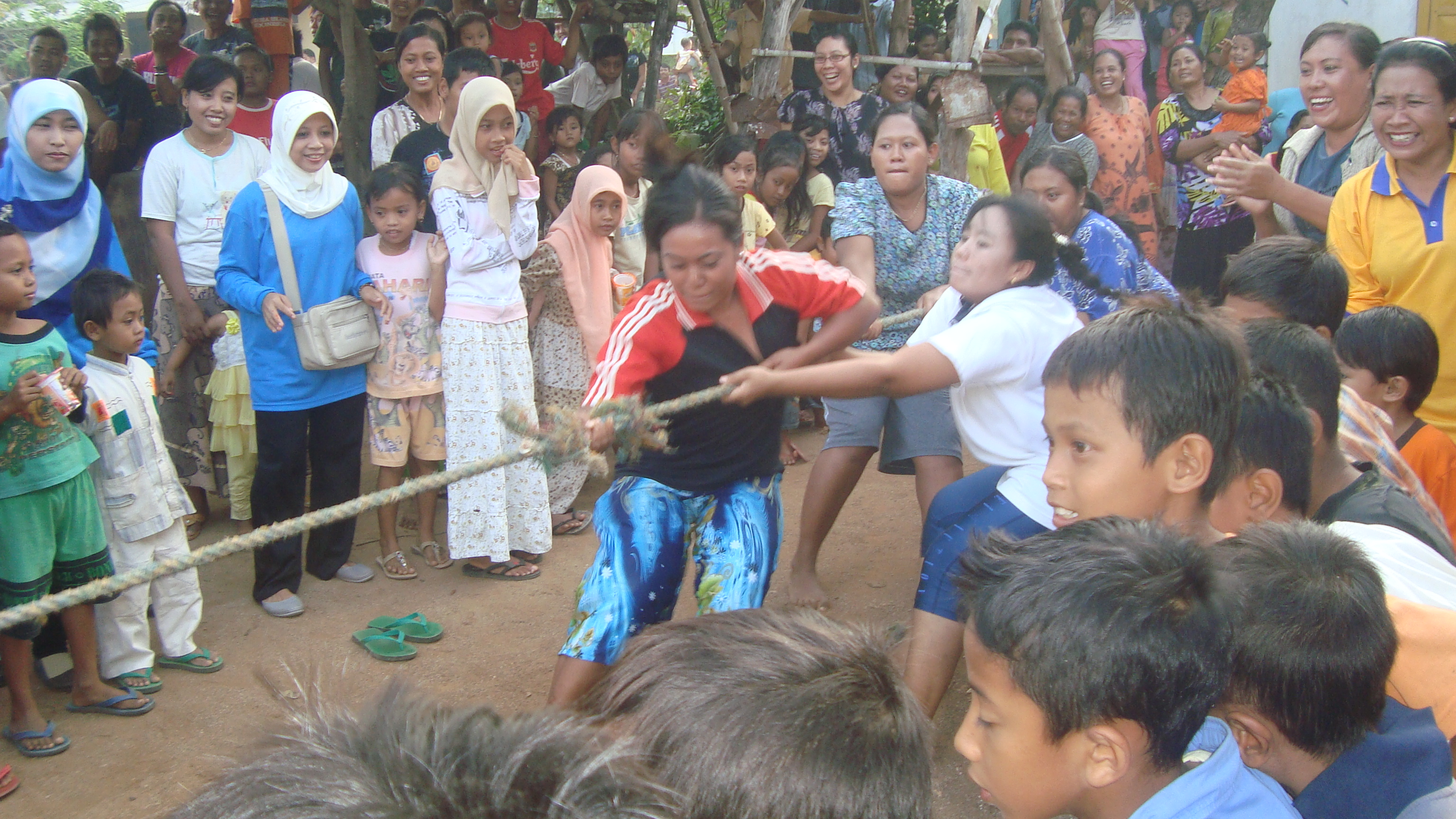
Tarik Tambang

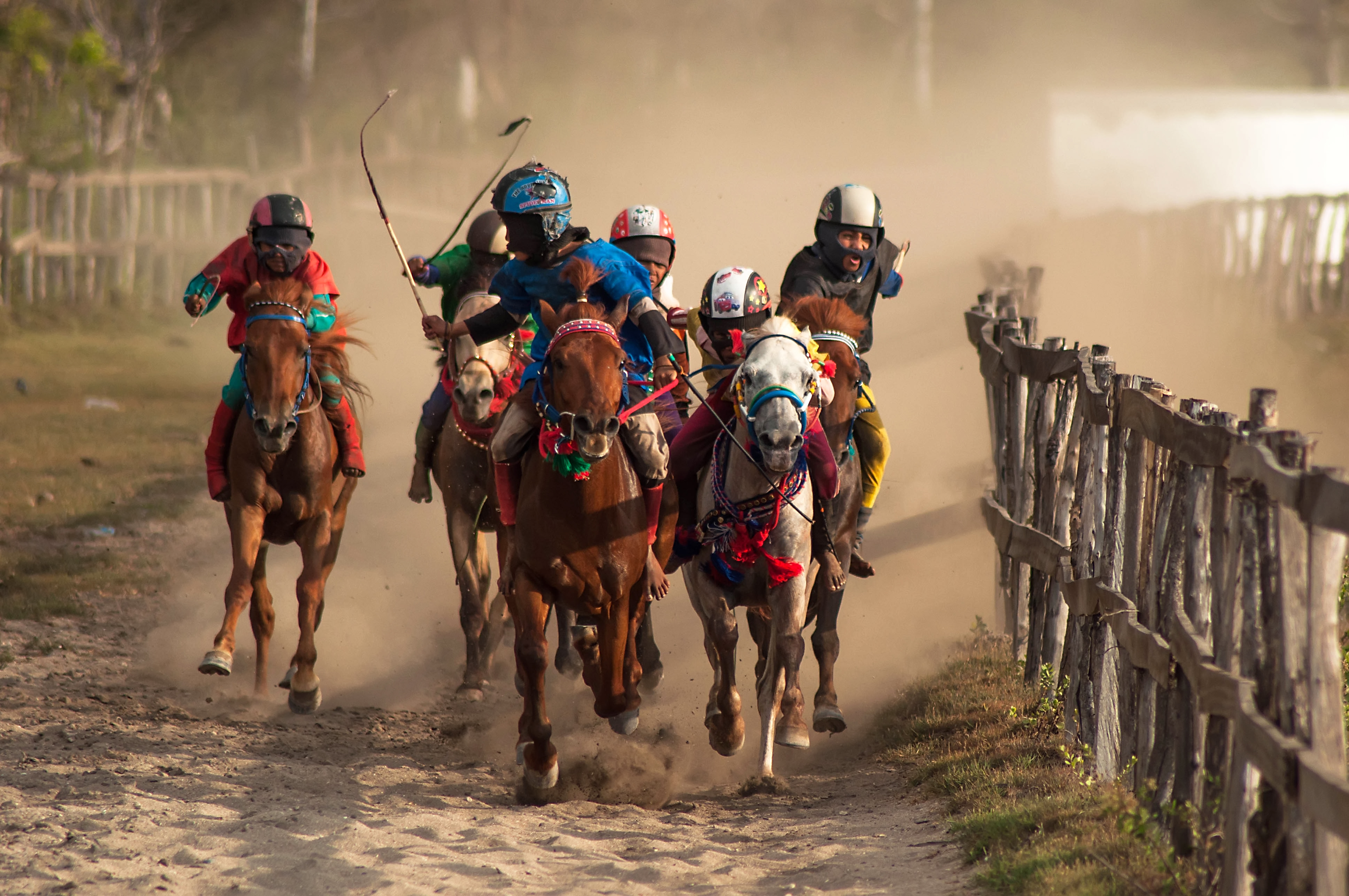
Maen jaran in Sumbawa, West Nusa Tenggara

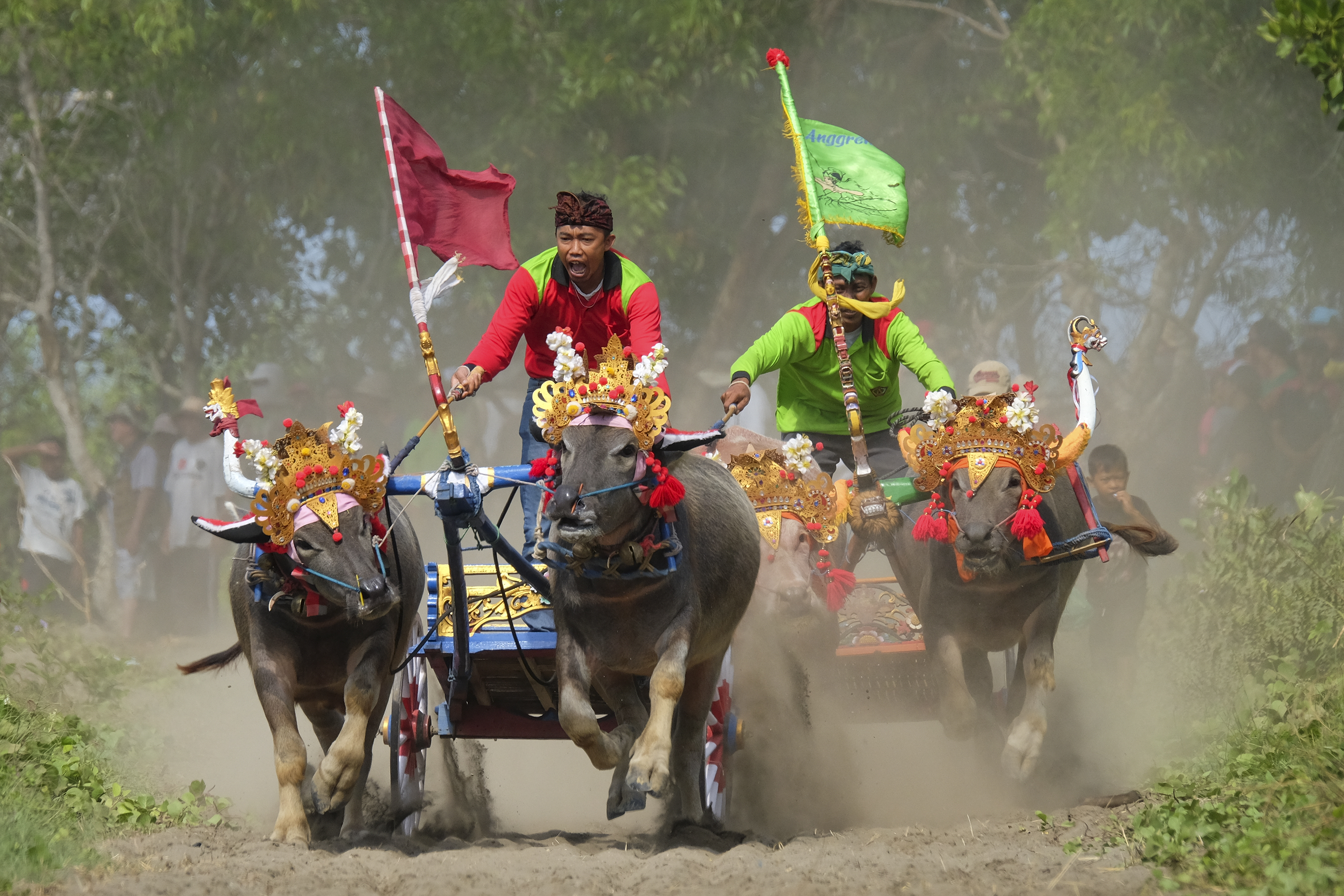
Makepung buffalo race in Jembrana Regency, Bali

== Popular media ==
=== Cinema ===
The largest chain of cinemas in Indonesia is 21 Cineplex, which has cinemas spread throughout twenty-four cities on the major islands of Indonesia. Many smaller independent cinemas also exist.

In the 1980s, the film industry in Indonesia was at its peak, and dominated the cinemas in Indonesia with movies that have retained a high reputation, such as Catatan Si Boy and Blok M and actors like Onky Alexander, Meriam Bellina, Nike Ardilla and Paramitha Rusady. The film Tjoet Nja' Dhien (1988) winning 9 Citra Awards at the 1988 Indonesian Film Festival. It was also the first Indonesian movie chosen for screening at the Cannes Film Festival, where it was awarded Best International Film in 1989. However, the film industry failed to continue its successes in the 1990s, when the number of movies produced decreased significantly, from 115 movies in 1990 to just 37 in 1993. As a result, most movies produced in the 1990s contained adult themes. The industry started to recover in the late 1990s, with the rise of independent directors and many new movies produced, such as Garin Nugroho's Cinta dalam Sepotong Roti, Riri Riza and Mira Lesmana's Petualangan Sherina and Arisan! by Nia Dinata. Another form of recovery is the re-establishment of the Indonesian Film Festival (FFI), inactive for twelve years, and the creation of the Jakarta International Film Festival. Daun di Atas Bantal (1998) received Asia Pacific Film Festival in Taipei.

=== Radio ===
The public radio network Radio Republik Indonesia (RRI) was founded in 1945. It consists of a network of regional stations located in all provinces of the archipelago. In most cities and large towns there are also many commercial stations. Since 2006, several digital radio stations have been based in Jakarta and Surabaya, using Digital Audio Broadcasting (DAB) and Hybrid HD-Radio.

== Religion and philosophy ==
Islam is Indonesia's main religion, with almost 88% of Indonesians declared Muslim according to the 2000 census, making Indonesia the most populous Muslim-majority nation in the world. The remaining population is 9% Christian (of which roughly two-thirds are Protestant with the remainder mainly Catholic, and a large minority Charismatic), 2% Hindu, and 1% Buddhist.

The Pancasila, the statement of two principles that encapsulate the ideology of the Indonesian state, affirms that "The state shall be based on the belief in the one and only God".

Some Indonesian ritual worship

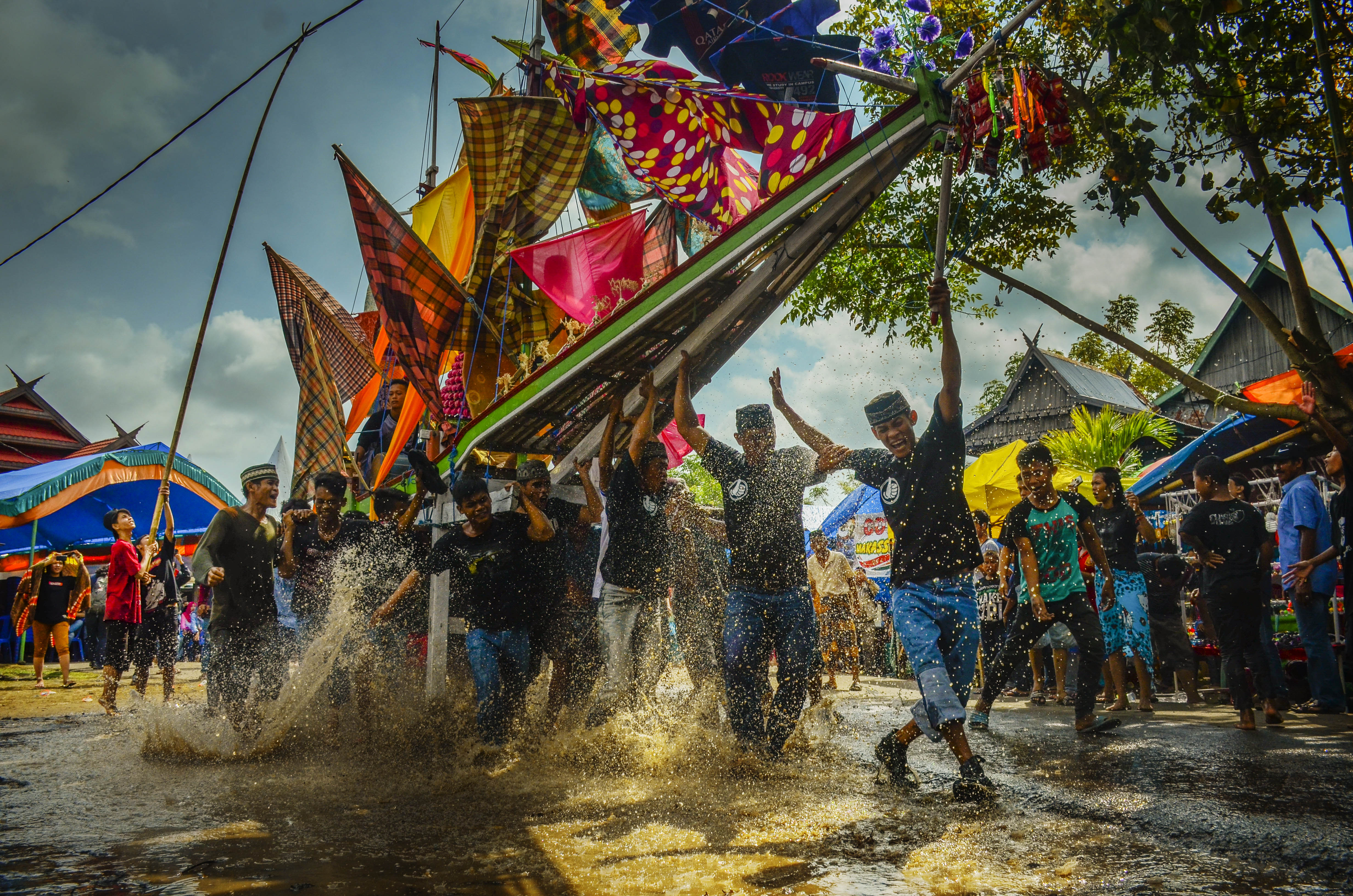
Maudu Lompoa tradition in Sulawesi, to commemorate the birthday of Muhammad

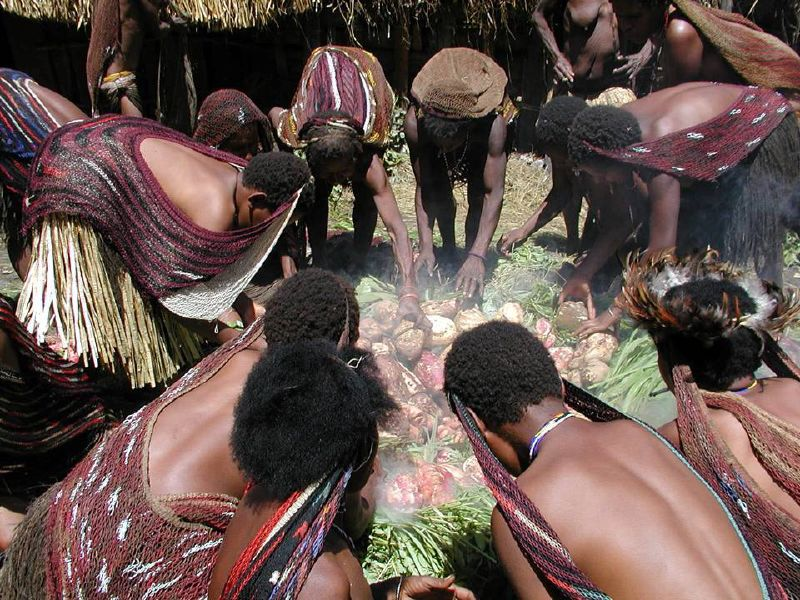
Christmas in Papua is marked with Barapen (grilling stone)

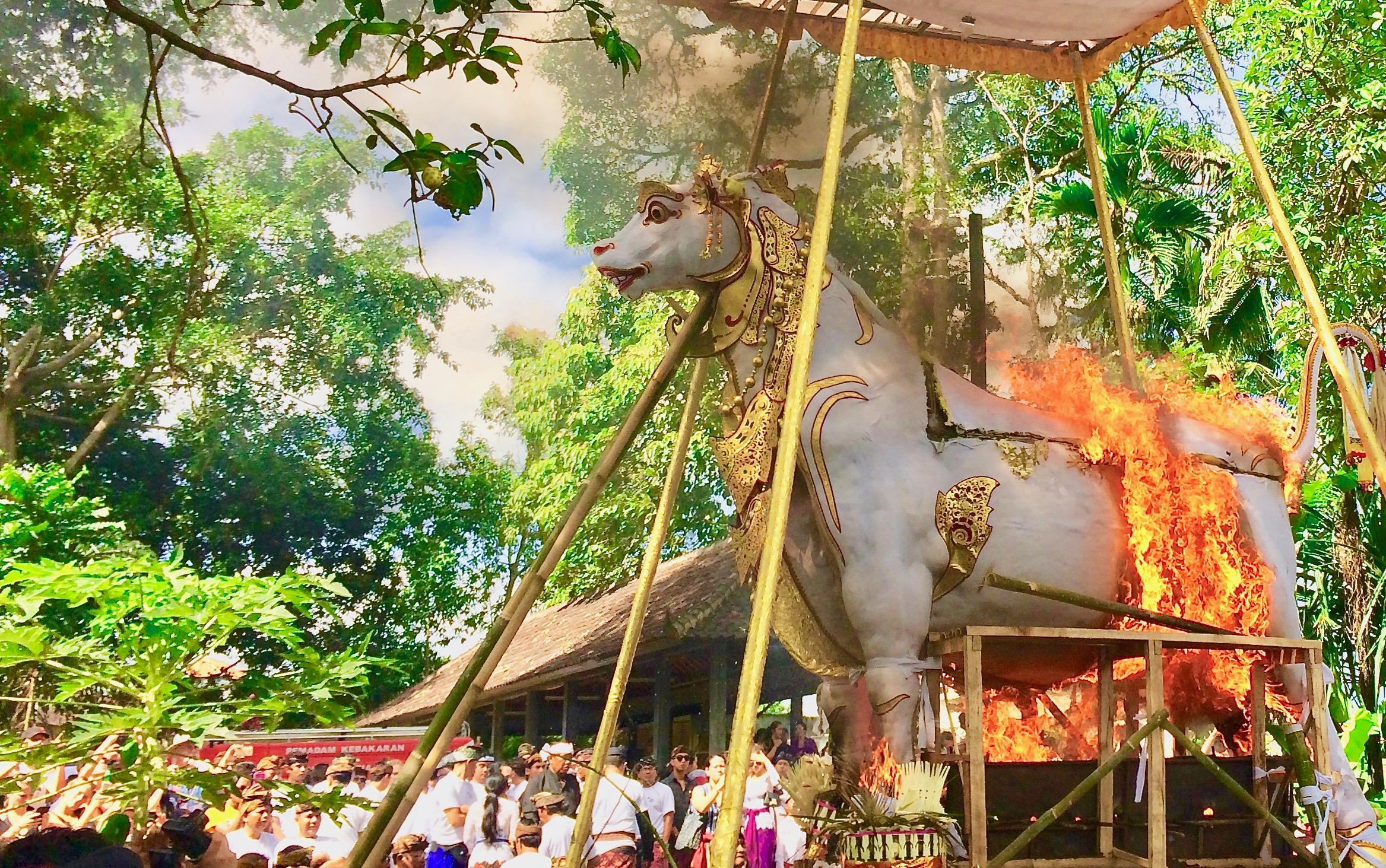
Cremation (Ngaben) Hindu ceremony

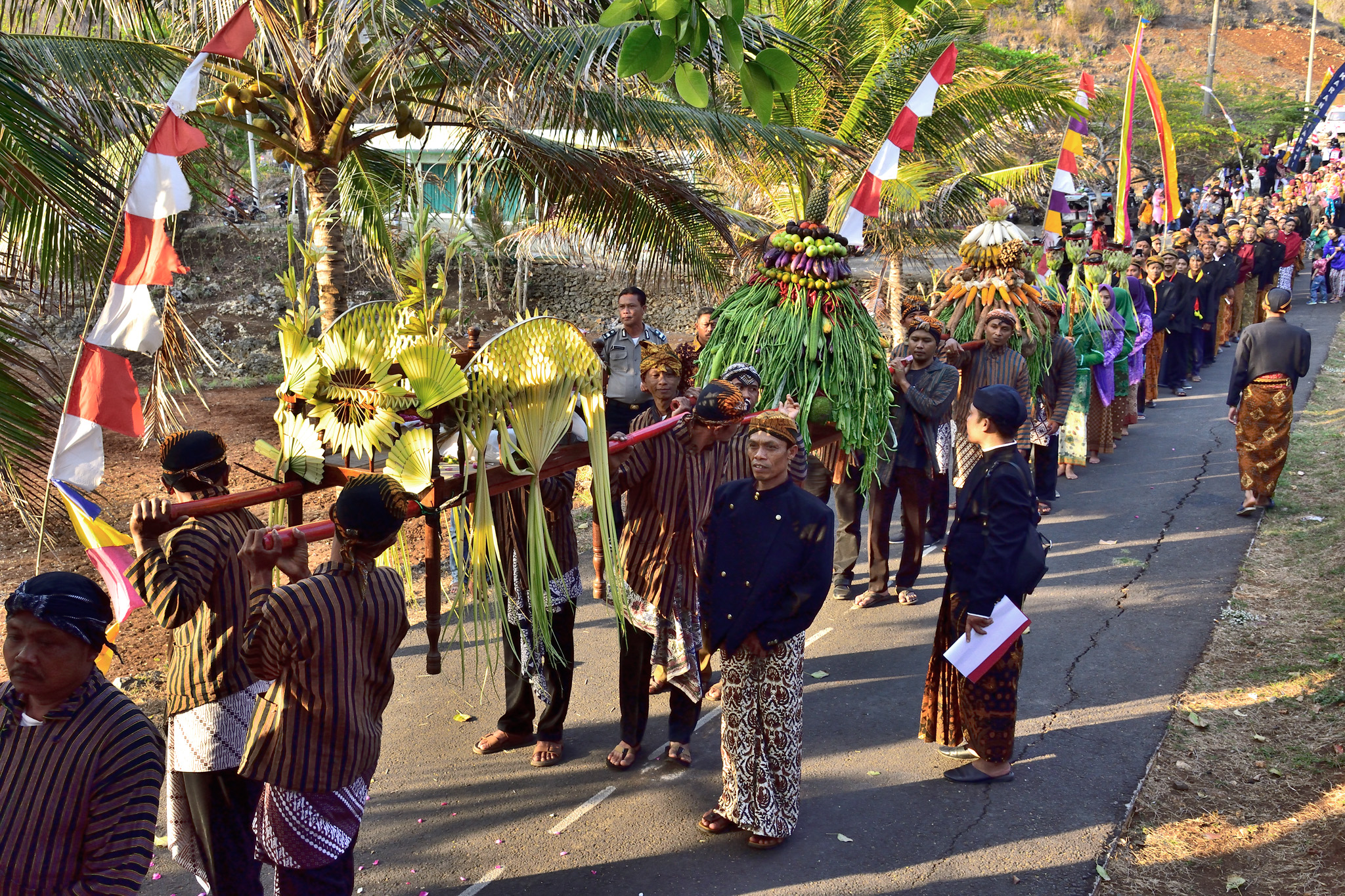
Labuhan procession in Yogyakarta is believed to help preserve the balance of nature

== Celebrations ==
Date (Gregorian Calendar)	Date (Religious Calendar)	English name	Local name	Remarks
1 January		New Year's Day	Tahun Baru Masehi	
	Rabi' al-awwal 12	Birth of the Prophet	Maulid Nabi Muhammad	Birthday of the Islamic Prophet Muhammad
January–February		Chinese New Year	Tahun Baru Imlek	1st day of 1st month of Chinese Calendar
March	Kasa 1 Pawukon 40	Day of Silence	Hari Raya Nyepi (Tahun Baru Saka)	New Year of Balinese saka calendar
March–April		Good Friday	Wafat Yesus Kristus/Isa Almasih (Jumat Agung)	Date varies; this is the Friday before Easter Sunday, which is the first Sunday after the first Paschal Full Moon following the official vernal equinox
1 May		Labour Day	Hari Buruh	
May–June		Ascension of Jesus Christ	Kenaikan Yesus Kristus/Isa Almasih	
May	Every May of Vaisakha	Buddha's Birthday	Waisak	In Indonesia it is celebrated as Trisuci Waisak, to commemorate three important events in Buddhism; Buddha's birthday, enlightenment and his death. The date varies according to the Buddhist calendar
	Rajab 27	Ascension of the Prophet	Isra Mi'raj Nabi Muhammad	
1 June		Pancasila Day	Hari Lahir Pancasila	Public holiday since 2016, marks the date of Sukarno's 1945 address on the national ideology
17 August		Independence Day	Hari Proklamasi Kemerdekaan R.I.	Sukarno and Mohammad Hatta as the proclaimers
	Shawwal 1–2	Eid al-Fitr	Idul Fitri (Lebaran Mudik)	Date varies according to the Islamic calendar
	Dhu al-Hijjah 10	Feast of the Sacrifice	Idul Adha (Lebaran Haji)	Date varies according to the Islamic calendar
	Muharram 1	Islamic New Year	Tahun Baru Hijriyah	1st day of the Muharram, the beginning of the new Islamic year
25 December		Christmas	Natal	

== See also ==
- Demographics of Indonesia
- List of libraries in Indonesia
- List of museums and cultural institutions in Indonesia
- National Intangible Cultural Heritage of Indonesia
