= Caci (fighting) =

Floresian whip fighting

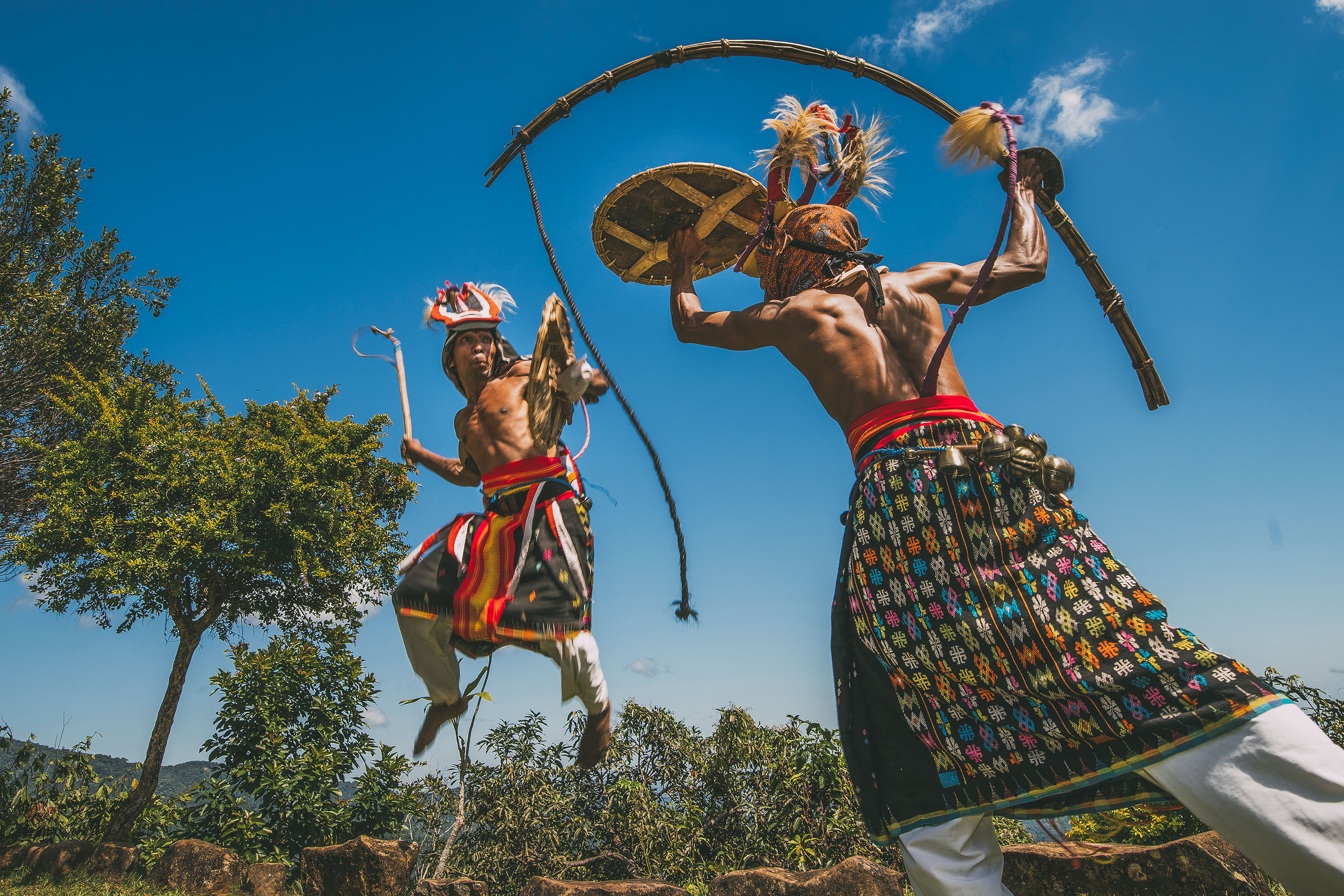
- Caci duel using whip and shield, Manggarai on Flores Island, East Nusa Tenggara, Indonesia.
- Focus: Whip fighting
- Hardness: Full-contact, semi-contact, light-contact
- Country of origin: Indonesia
- Olympic sport: No

Caci (Indonesian pronunciation: [tʃatʃi]) is a form of fighting with a whip or stick. It appears to be indigenous to Flores in East Nusa Tenggara, but it is also practiced in neighboring islands of Bali and Lombok, Indonesia. The art is sometimes called cacing or ende in Flores, and larik or kebat in Riung, while in Balinese it is known as ende.

Caci is mainly performed by Manggarai people distributed within the greater Manggarai cultural area of western parts of Flores island, which today consists of three regencies; West, Central, and East, and also the neighboring Ngada Regency. Caci performance is most prevalent in Manggarai Regency, especially in the town of Ruteng, where this ritual whip fight has become a major element of its people's cultural identity. Originated as a part of harvest ritual, this whip dueling spectacle has grown to become an attraction for foreign as well as domestic visitors.

== Etymology ==
The term caci is said to derive from the Manggarai words ca meaning one and ci meaning test, indicating a one-on-one test between the fighters. Caci is an ancient fighting art indigenous to the Lesser Sunda Islands.

== Legend ==
According to local folklore, caci during festivals began with two brothers who owned a buffalo. When the younger brother fell into a deep hole, the older brother had to slaughter the buffalo to get its skin to help his sibling escape from the hole. The community celebrated this act of love with a festival in which caci matches were held.

== Styles, equipments and weapons ==
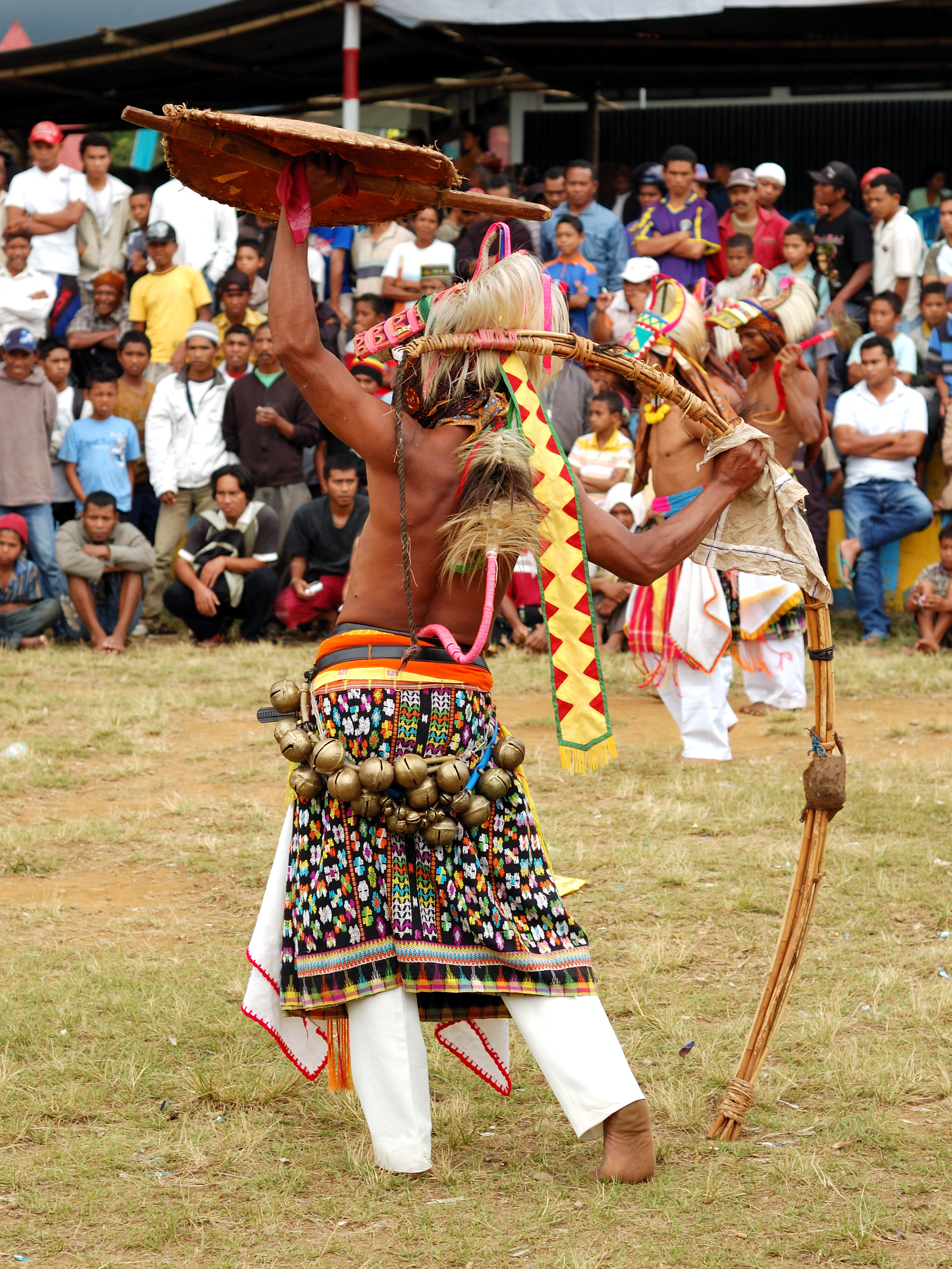
Caci fighter wearing horned helmet, songket sarong with bells, and holding a rattan whip and shield.

Competitors are bare-chested and wear pants covered by an embroidered woven sarung songke (songket sarong). Their lower backs and ankles are adorned with small jingling bells, which make peculiar sounds when moving and fighting. The upper body is intentionally uncovered in order to be exposed to the whips' lashes. The masked helmets are made of buffalo hide that is wrapped in colourful cloths with horn-like headgear, along with head-cloths worn over the face.

There are two types of caci: with a whip (tereng or agang) or a stick (agang). The whip may be either long or short. The short whip corresponds to the cambuk of Java and measures 3 feet (0.91 m) in length. The long whip is 5–6 feet (1.5–1.8 m) long and is made from palm stems tied together with either rattan or strips of water buffalo hide. The stick is an undecorated piece of hardwood measuring 1–1.5 yards (0.91–1.37 m) long and 2 inches (5.1 cm) in diameter.

The shield has a round or elliptical shape. Also traditionally undecorated, it is known as giling or nggiling when made of buffalo hide and perisai kayu when made of wood. Both the whip and the stick form were traditionally practiced in Manggarai Regency, but the stick is rarely seen today. In Bali and Ngada Regency, only the stick form exists.

== Rules and technique ==
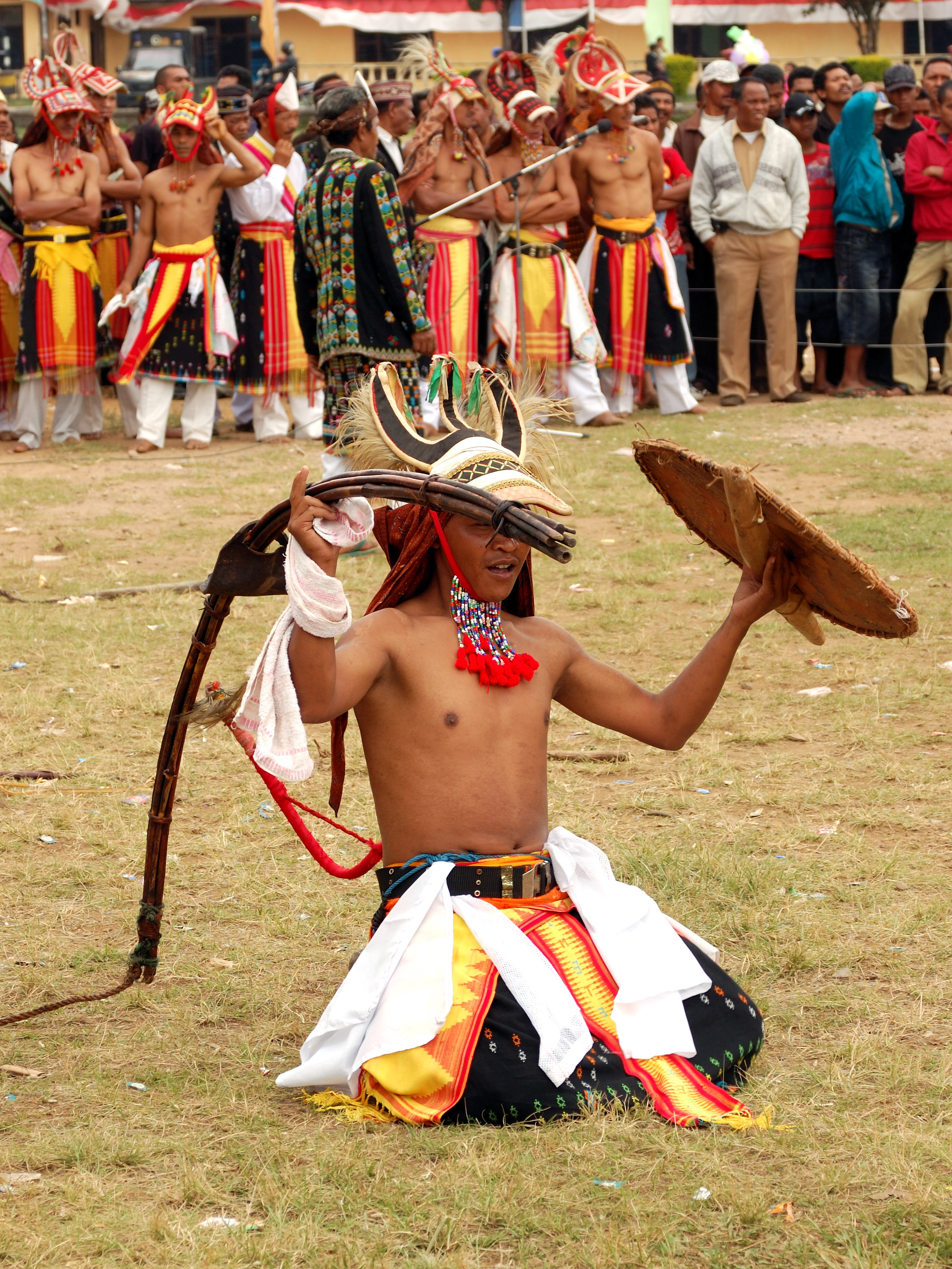
Caci warrior holding a rattan whip and shield.

A caci whip fight is performed by two contenders — always male — who usually comes from different villages. After a starting signal, the whip and shield duel commences. During the start of the match, the contenders might go back and forth in a prancing manner, thus jiggling and ringings the bells attached on their hips and ankles. The ringing of the bells is meant to be a provocation, initiating some moves to taunt each opponent and enliven the battle. While in the background, musicians beat the drums and gongs, and the supporters cheering.

In a caci match, the two fighters take turns alternately attacking and defending. The attacker is permitted three blows to any part of the anatomy, while the defender attempts to block with his shield. The defender is not allowed to attack while defending, but in the case of whip-fighting the defender may spin the whip above his head to prevent the attacker from closing in. Stick techniques on the other hand are all swings with no thrusting or poking allowed.

All parts of the opponent's body is allowed to be struck. However, contenders will mostly aim for the opponent's upper body, especially their head, since landing a successful assault on the opponent's face or head is considered to be the highest point. Therefore, wearing protective equipment like the traditional horned helmet — which protects the forehead, eyes and face — is highly required. Suffering a hit in the face or on the head means instantly losing the game. The roles of the attacker and defender are reversed after each whip strikes. After four turns, the winner is decided, and the next pair of opponents will be taken to the arena and have their fight.

== Cultural significance ==
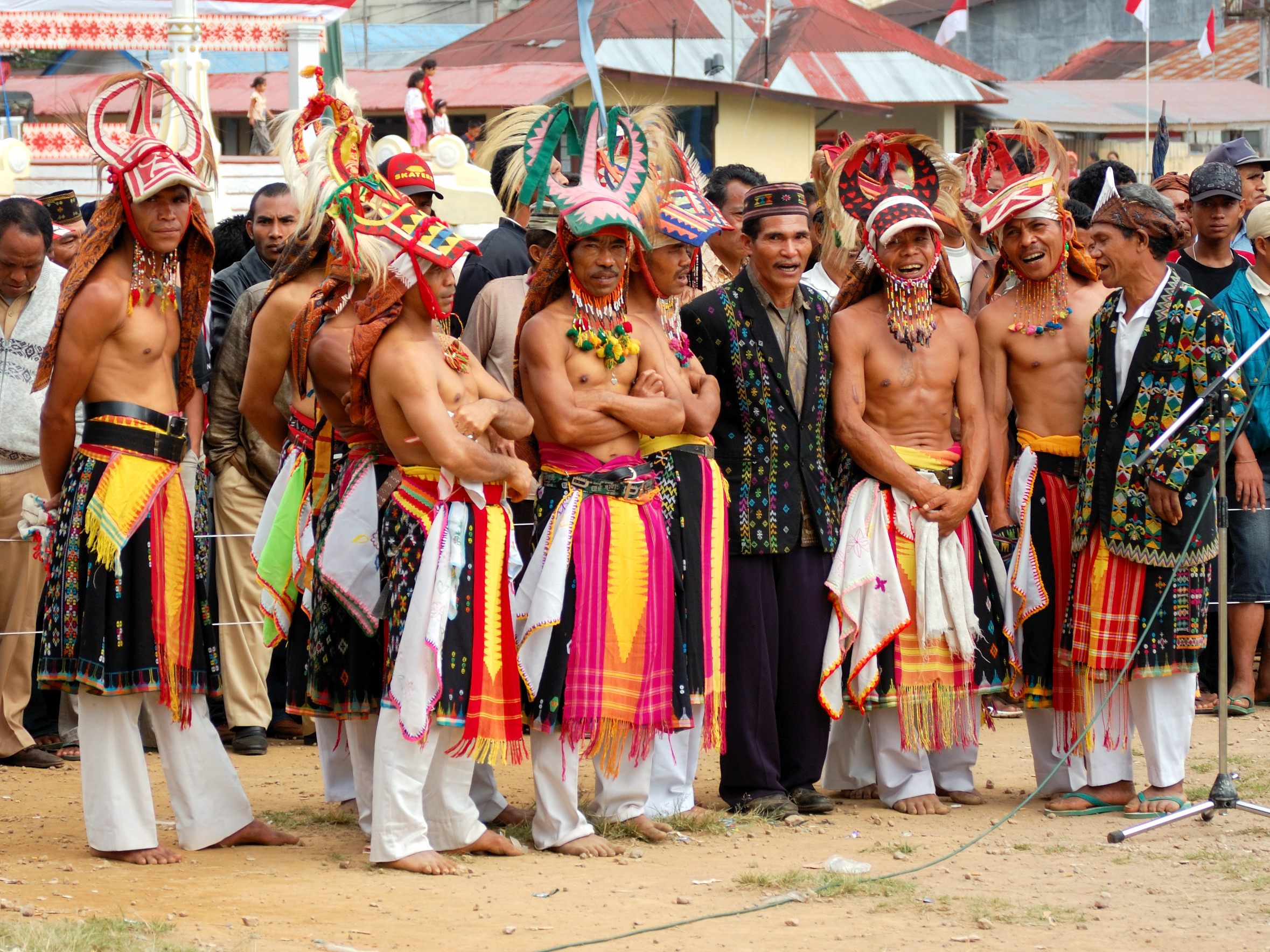
Caci warriors preparing to perform during a festival in Ruteng on Flores Island, East Nusa Tenggara.

Caci at one time served as a form of dispute management or conflict settlement within and between villages. Fighters are divided into the host group (ata one) and the challenger group from another village (ata pe’ang or meka landang). In former times, championship bouts were held in which the objective was to blind the opponent's eye. The winner is required to happily sing a quatrain while the loser replies in a low voice to show despair. Participants must be agile, physically fit and able to sing local songs.

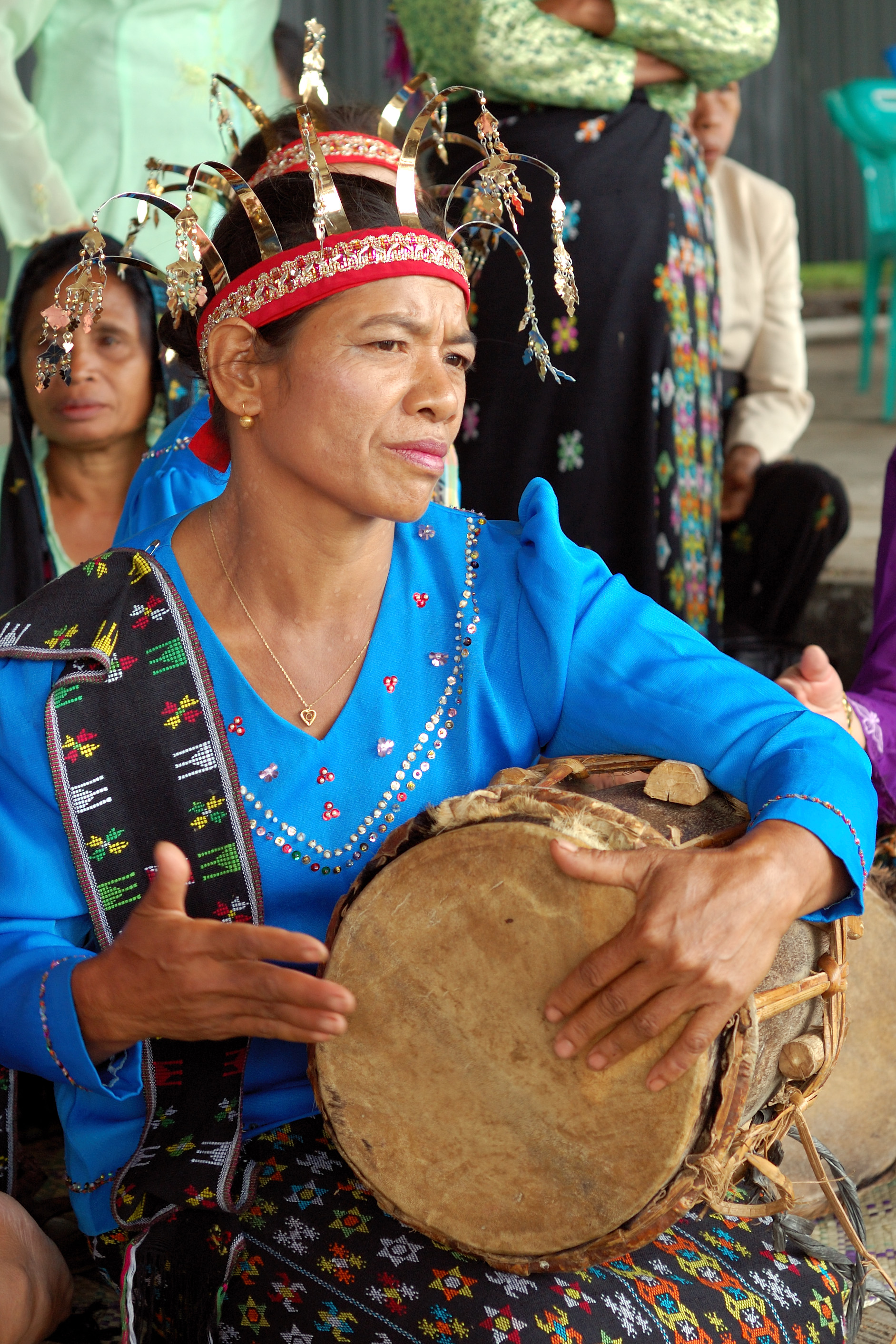
Women playing a drum as musical accompaniment for Caci fighting.

Although caci is often considered as somewhat a playful competitive sporting event, it also has a sacrificial function. According to local belief, if the back of a fighter's body gets whipped, there will be a good harvest. The blood dripping from the wound constitutes as an offering to the ancestors for fertility of the soil.

Matches are usually held in the yard of a communal house. Younger boys compete early in the day while senior fighter and champion fights take part during the afternoon. During the match, musicians, who are usually women will gather and play drums and gongs as a musical accompaniment to encourage the contestants as well as the spectators.

Caci in modern times is often mistaken to be a dance, but actually throughout its history until as recently as the 1970s, it was a realistic fighting art. Seasoned fighters were heavily scarred on their upper body, while losers further had the mark of the defeating blow on their face, or worse — having one of his eyes blind. Today however, injuries are usually shallow enough to heal within a few days.

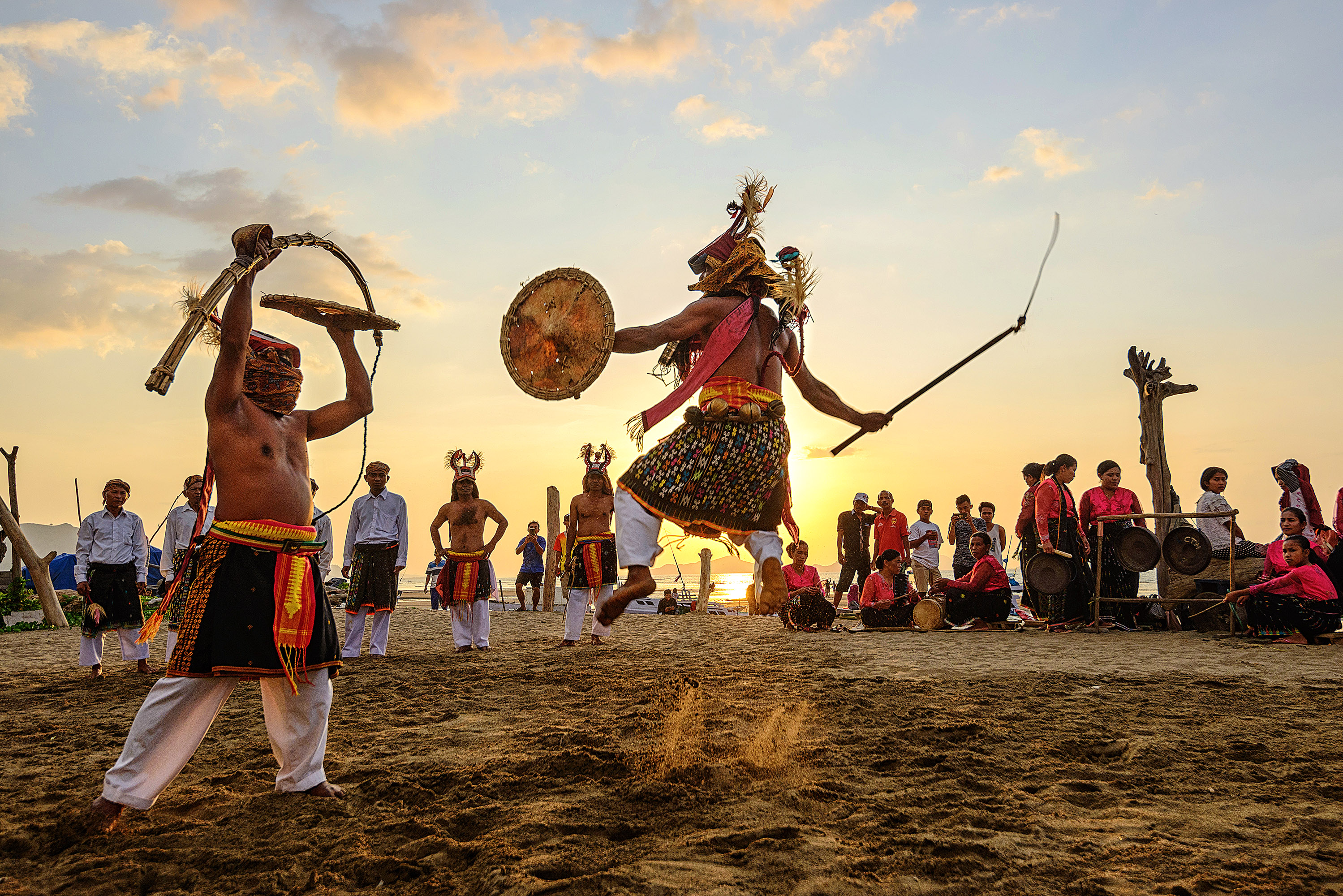
Caci whip fighting is one of the traditional fighting arts of the Manggarai community on Flores Island, East Nusa Tenggara.

Fights were traditionally held almost weekly but waned in popularity until they only took place during festivals. Today however, the interest from tourists has made caci more common. But with changing agricultural circumstances, the art today is disconnected from its traditional symbolism. The length of the ritual is drastically shortened, showing only fragments of the actual fight.

Caci can still be seen in its original context during the Penti ceremony, which are held usually at 5-year intervals. Caci is most frequently performed during Penti, a traditional harvest festival to mark the end of harvest and the beginning of the new crop cycle. During Penti festivals, caci fights might last at least a full day — but more often they may take two or three days — accompanied by the music of gongs and drums, attracting people to come to cheer and support the champion from their village, and it was held in such festivities.

In East Manggarai Regency, the caci whip fight is performed by the men of the Ndolu ethnic group during the peak of the Karong Woja Wole traditional festival. Karong Woja Wole is a traditional harvest ceremony, marked by delivering newly reaped rice from the lodok puran kae (crop field) on Ndolu Hill, to the gendang ndolu (traditional house) in Waekekik hamlet.

== See also ==
- Indonesian martial arts
- Pencak silat
- Stick-fighting
- Whip fighting
- Perang pandan
- Cakalele
- Kabasaran
