= Pasola =

Equestrian bloodsport

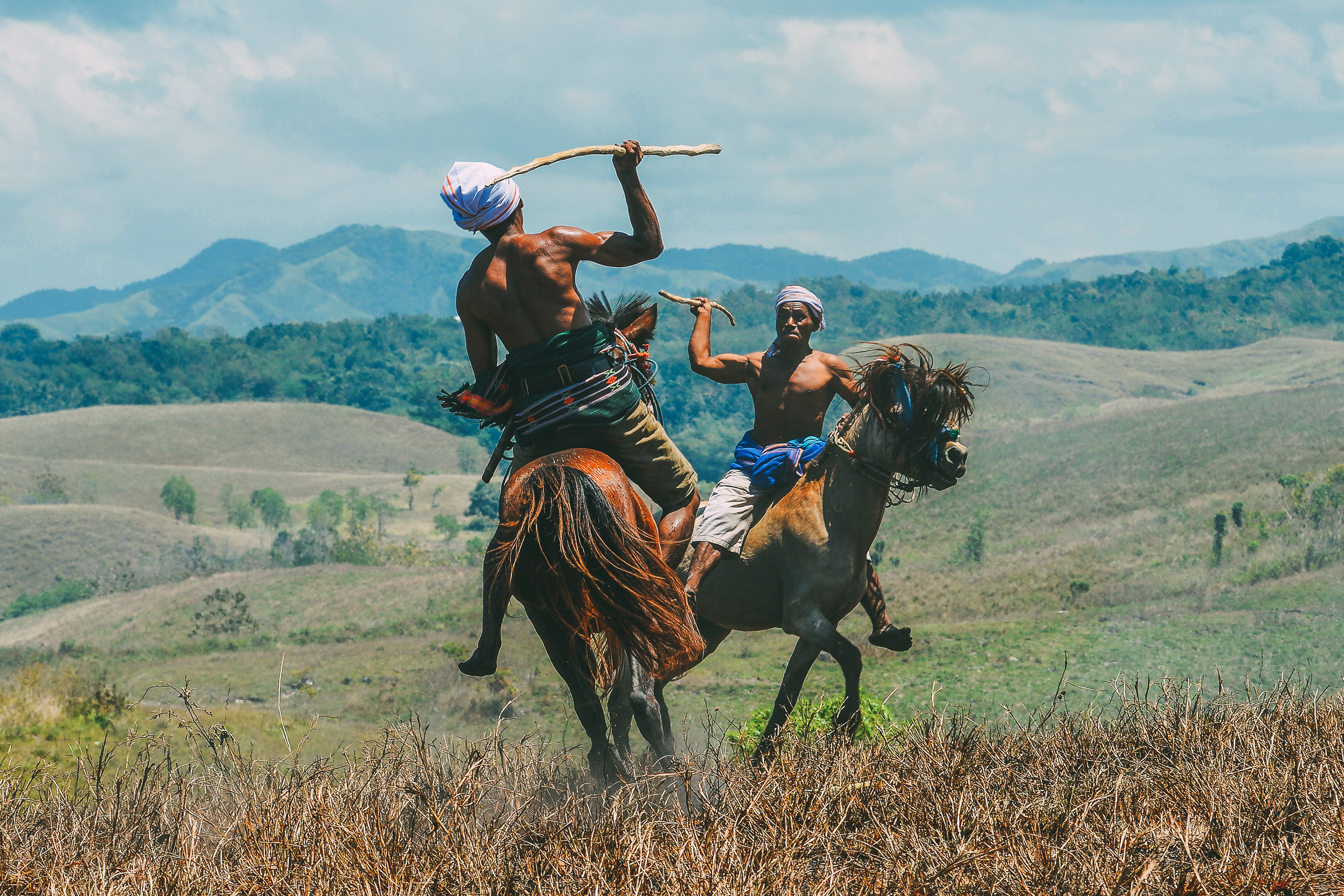
- Pasola match, 2016
- Focus: Whip fighting
- Hardness: Full-contact, semi-contact, light-contact
- Country of origin: Indonesia
- Olympic sport: No

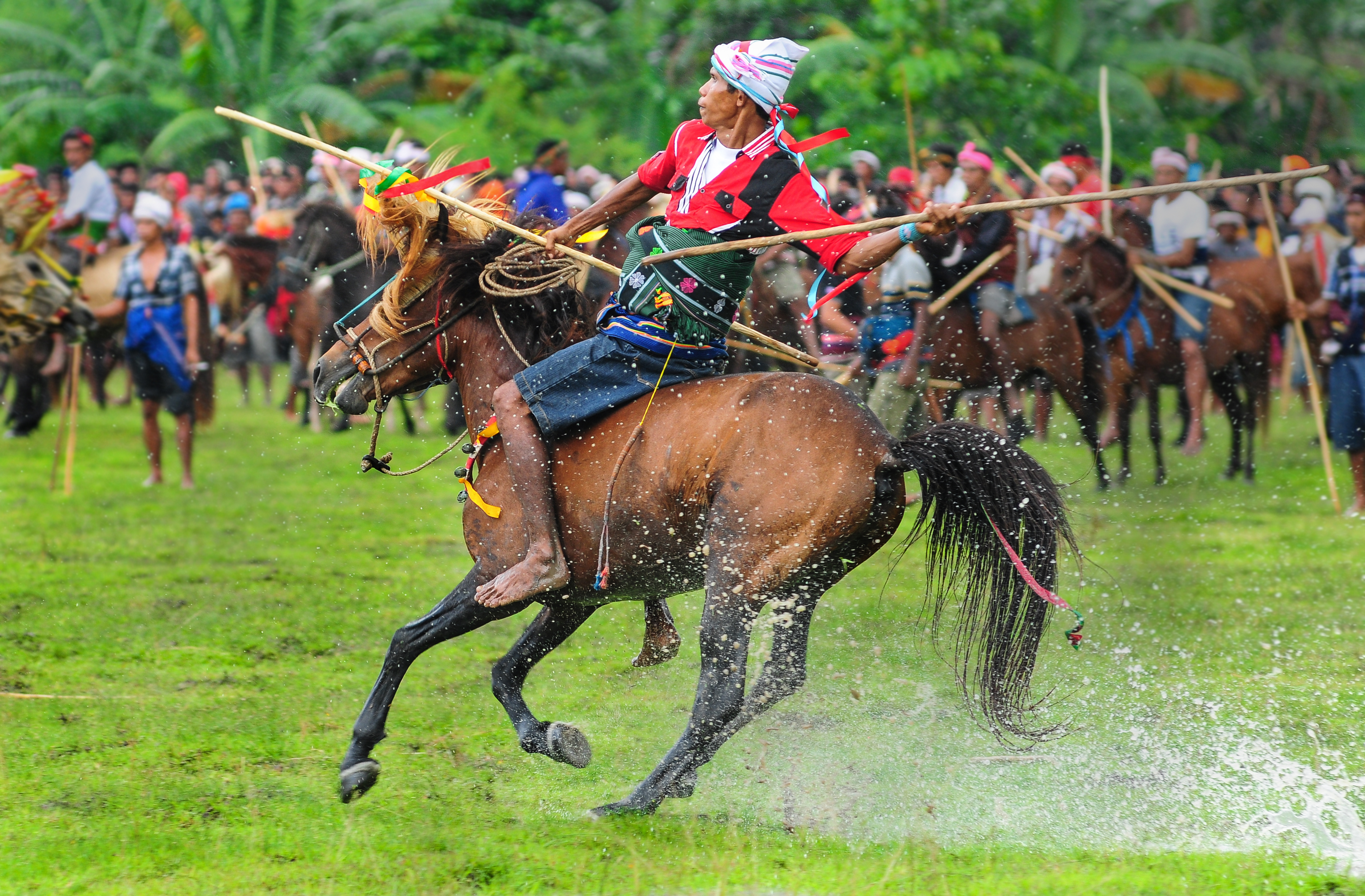
Pasola competitor, 2014

Pasola is a mounted spear-fighting competition from western Sumba, Indonesia. It is played by throwing wooden spears at the opponent while riding a horse to celebrate the rice-planting season. The word pasola means spear in the local language and derives from the Sanskrit sula. According to legend, pasola originated with a woman from the village of Waiwuang. When her husband – a local leader – left home for an extended period, she believed him to be dead and eloped with a new lover from another village. After her husband returned, the woman still chose to stay with her new lover, and the two were married. To forget their leader's sadness, the people of Waiwuang held the festival of pasola. Originally the participants rode horses and threw spears at each other in an attempt to spill blood to the ground, as a way of thanking the ancestors for a successful harvest and ensuring another prosperous rice harvest. The ritual changed over time into more of a mock battle. The spear tips are now blunt and their metal tips removed. Whereas it was once considered an honour to die during pasola, only accidental deaths occasionally occur today. The human and horse blood which used to drench the field is now solely from sacrificed pigs, dogs, and chickens. Armed police are kept on guard to prevent fights from breaking out. Beginning in the 2010s, pasola has been promoted as a "game" for visiting spectators. The event traditionally begins when a certain kind of sea worm swims to shore, signifying the end of the wet season and the beginning of crop-planting. Today, the elders decide on the date in advance for the sake of tourists. Pasola is always held for four weeks in February and March.

== See also ==
- Indonesian martial arts
- List of festivals in Indonesia
- Jereed
