= Indonesian martial arts =

Overview of martial arts in Indonesia

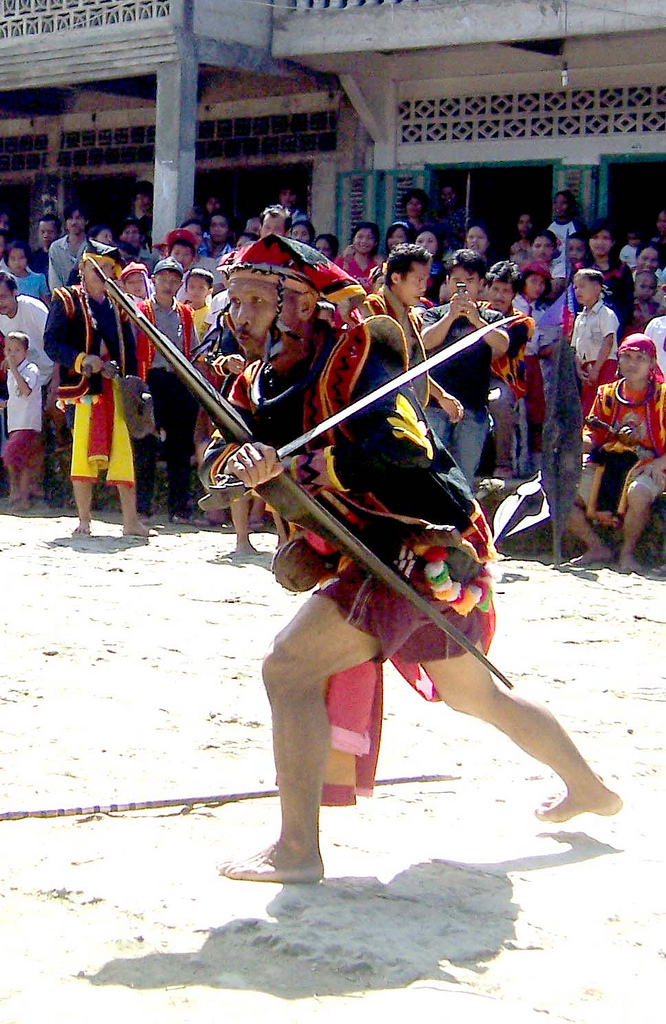
Nias swordsmanship

Indonesian martial arts includes a variety of fighting systems native to or developed in the archipelago of Indonesia, both the age-old traditional arts, and the more recently developed hybrid combatives. In the Indonesian language the term bela-diri (lit. self-defense) is used to mean martial art, and in essence the Indonesian fighting arts are meant as one's defence against perceived threat and assault. Other than physical training, they often include spiritual aspects to cultivate inner strength, inner peace and higher psychological ends.

Today, Indonesian fighting styles are synonymous with pencak silat, a term coined for the martial arts of the Indonesian archipelago. Nevertheless, a number of fighting arts in Indonesia are not included within the category of silat. Western misconception links silat with "jungle tribes" but in actuality, pencak silat was neither created nor traditionally practised by Indonesia's tribal inhabitants, many of whom have unique martial arts of their own. Some of these traditions have been preserved as a complete fighting system, e.g. pencak silat and kuntao. Other methods are either no longer practiced or only exist in a more sportive form such as the spear-throwing of pasola or the dance of cakalele.

== History ==
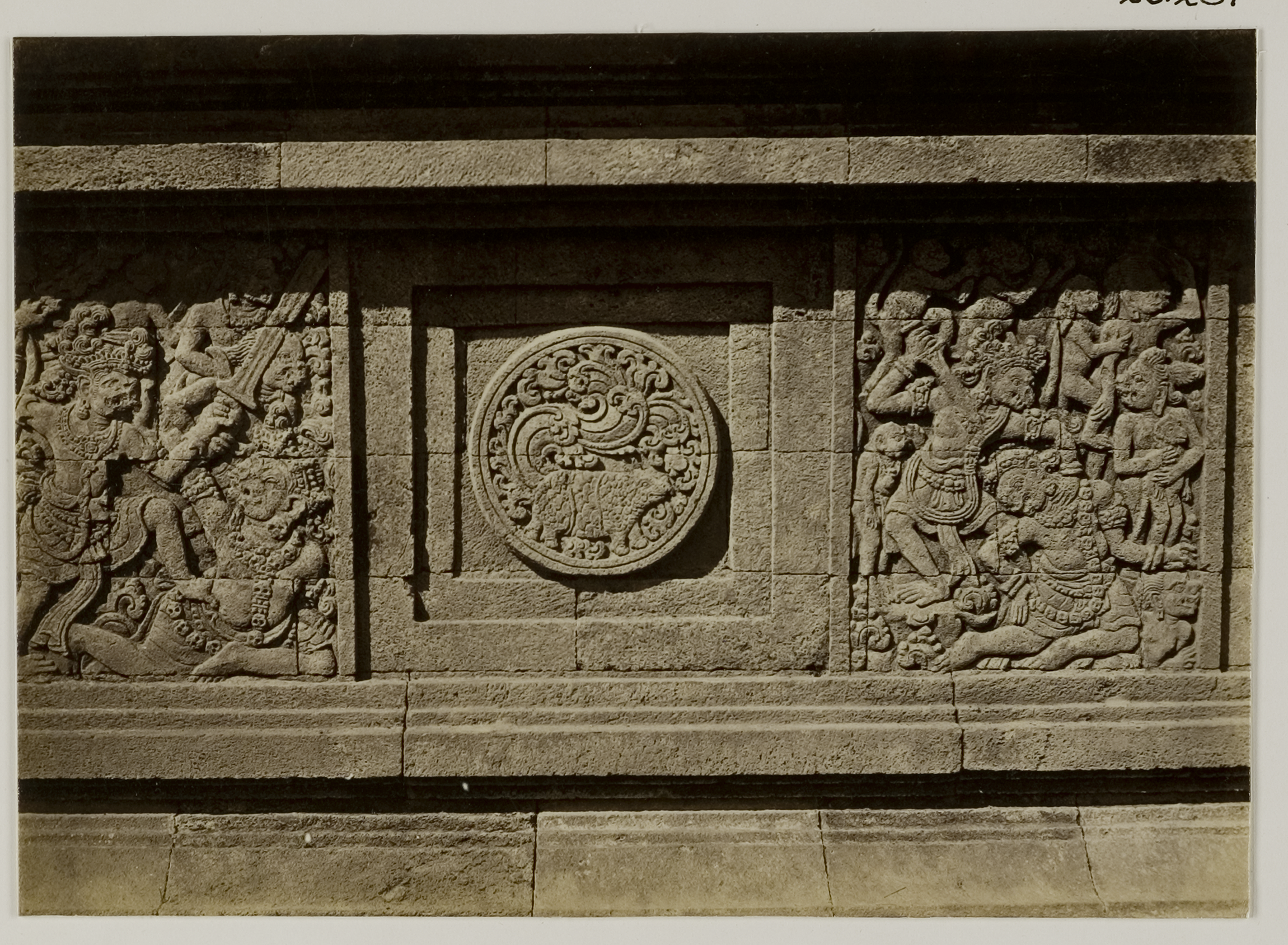
Battle scenes on bas-relief of Penataran, Majapahit era

Some parts of the archipelagic realm that is today Indonesia was the scene of warfare among the native populace for much of its long history, and the people of the region naturally developed effective methods of combat and self-defense. Archaeological findings dating from prehistoric times have uncovered a variety of stone and metal weaponry such as axes, arrows and spearheads. These implements would have doubled as hunting tools and weapons of combat between and among tribes. Tribal warfare, although often motivated by resources, lands and slave grabbing, was also a solution to settling disputes, as well as a component of coming of age rituals. The practice of headhunting developed the martial skills of some tribes to a high level such as the Dayak, Batak, and Nias people. Warriors from militaristic tribes were appreciated by other factions, and were recruited by developed kingdoms and polities as mercenaries. Traditional war dances were used both to reenact battles and as a form of training, a precursor to the preset forms or jurus of later fighting systems. Displaced Baiyue from present-day China and Vietnam (particularly the Dong Son culture) during the first centuries of the common era introduced bronze-casting to the Nusantara and resulted in the development of native edged weapons such as the parang, klewang, mandau, badik, kujang, golok and kris. Chinese straight swords arrived early, and ancient Javanese curved swords show Indian derivation.

Contact with India and the forming of ancient kingdoms lead to the transition from tribalism to the golden age that was Indonesia's Dharmic civilization. Pencak silat developed in this era, spreading quickly from Sumatra into nearly the whole of the archipelago. In comparison to the country's tribal fighting systems, pencak silat shows decidedly more influence from the Asian mainland, specifically China and the Indian subcontinent. Pencak silat tied the art of combat with practices of meditation and spiritual development, adding a new layer to the martial arts aside from merely being used to fight or kill so that it was used consistently throughout Indonesia's history. The wide geographical area in which pencak silat was practiced is naturally reflected in its diversity of techniques and weaponry, some indigenous and some adopted from outside through maritime trade. Chinese communities continued to establish themselves, their native kuntao influencing the local martial arts.

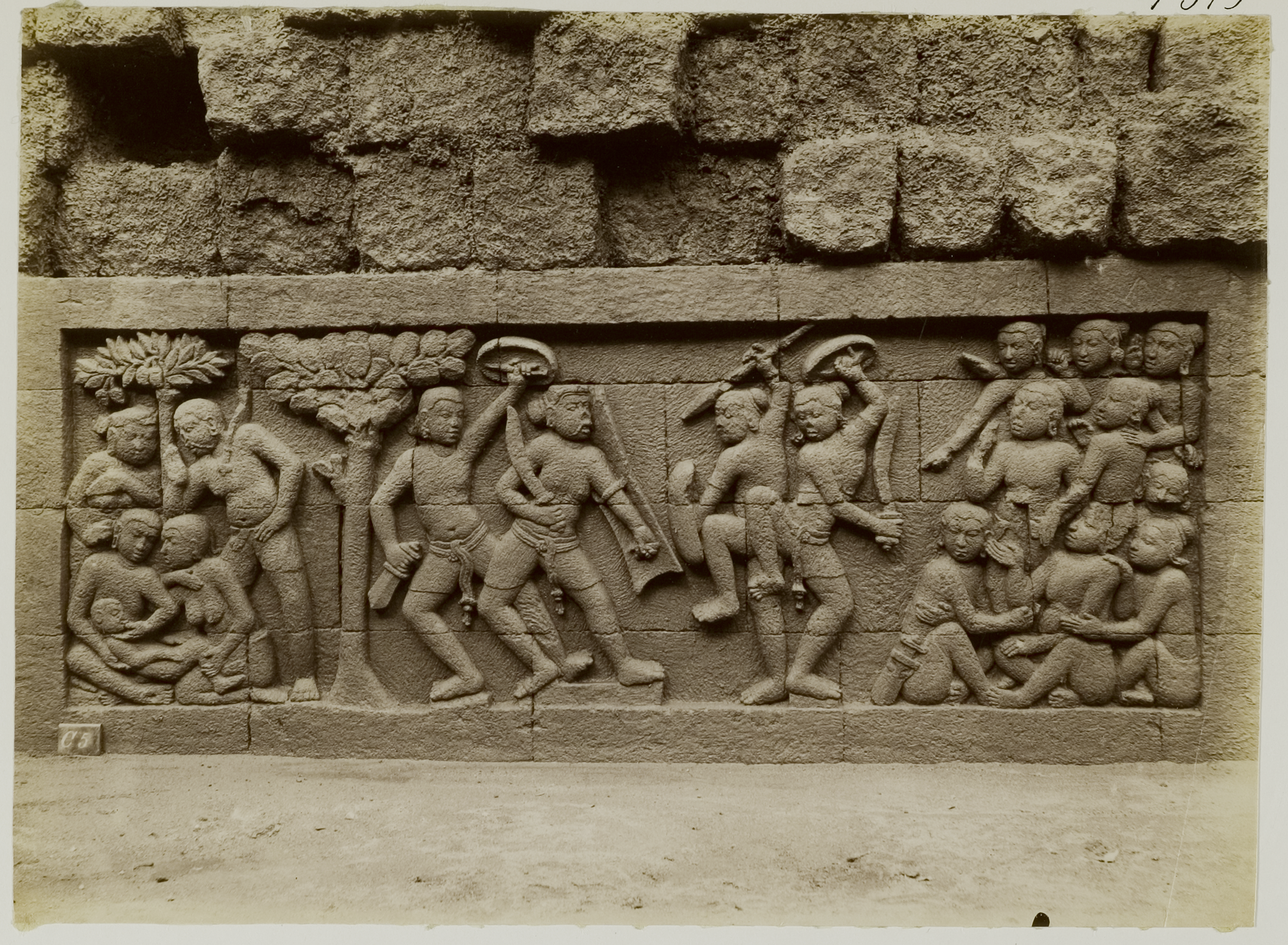
Bas-relief of weapons, shields, and fighting stances at Borobudur (9th century)

Gunpowder technology in cannons and muskets allowed many kingdoms and polities in Indonesia to be conquered and subjugated by European power. A further influx of Chinese were brought in as labourers, increasing the proliferation of kuntao styles. But while the Europeans could effectively overtake and hold the cities, they found it impossible to control the smaller villages and roads connecting them. Indonesians took advantage of this, fighting an underground war through guerrilla tactics. As guns were not widely available, indigenous blades were used in these attacks. Folklore portrays the rebels as Robin Hood-like martial artists such as Si Pitung. After Indonesia won its independence from colonization, the role of martial arts like pencak silat in nation-building was recognized. The Indonesian Pencak Silat Association (IPSI) was founded to unite the country's pencak silat schools under a single governing body. It has been incorporated into the unarmed combat training of Indonesia's police and military, as well as being an extra-curricular activity in schools, and a combat sport in athletic events. Many of the more violent martial practices such as headhunting and duels to the death either fell out of popularity or were banned. A number of fighting styles have managed to survive by adapting. In some cases they became less lethal like pasola, or at times by being promoted as a dance for the entertainment of tourists.

== Systems ==
The following are complete martial arts designed for fighting or self-defense.

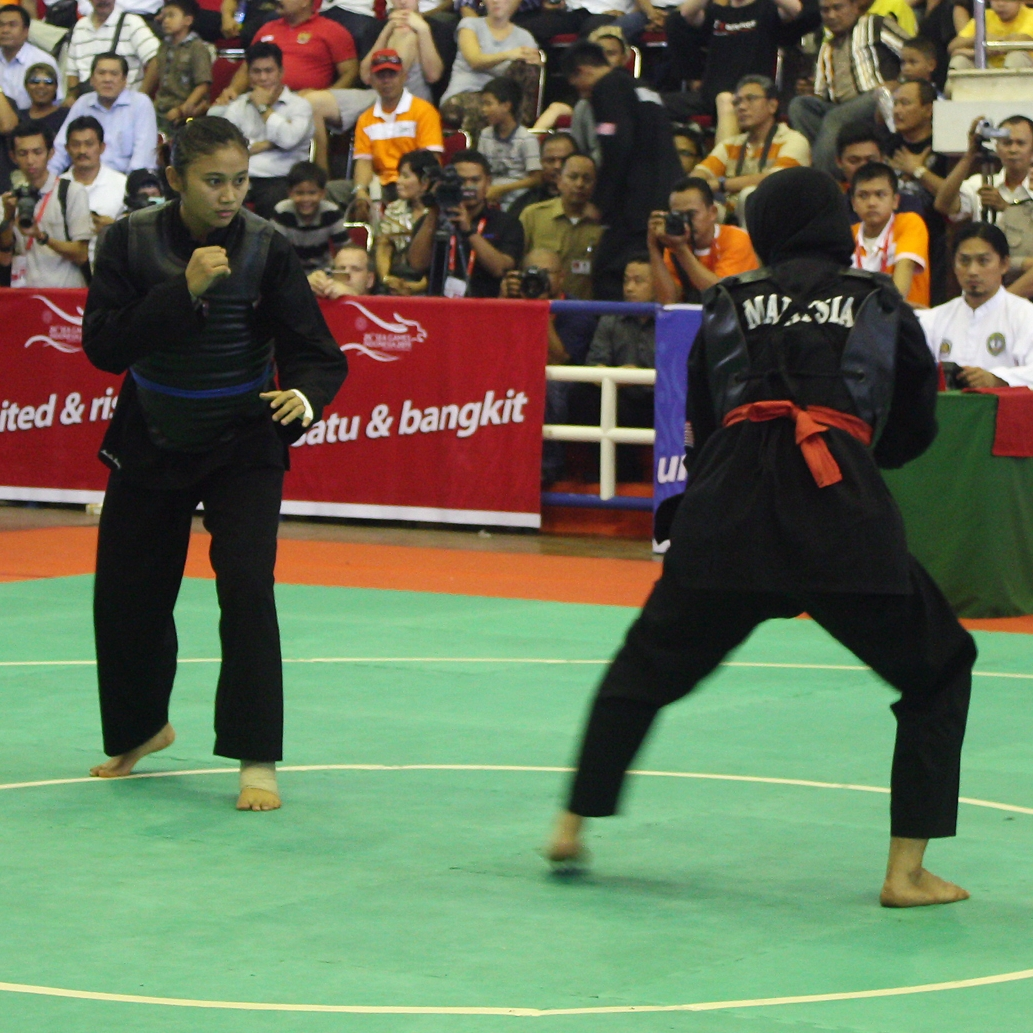
Pencak silat tournament in SEA Games XXVI.

=== Pencak Silat ===
Pencak silat is a compound of the two most commonly used words for martial arts in Indonesia. Pencak was the term used in central and east Java, while silat was used in Sumatra and Borneo. In modern usage, pencak and silat are seen as being two aspects of the same practice. Pencak is the essence of training, the outward aspect of the art. Silat is the internal essence of combat and self-defense, the true fighting application of the techniques. The earliest evidence of pencak silat is in 6th-century Riau from where it saw further development under Indian and Chinese influence in the Hindu-Buddhist kingdoms of Sumatra and Java. The art gradually spread throughout most of what is now Indonesia and reached its peak in the medieval Majapahit kingdom. Generalizations of silat techniques are difficult due to the diversity of systems. Any part of the body is used and subject to attack. Strikes, grabs, locks, and weapons are all incorporated. Training is often supplemented with internal methods of development such as meditation.

=== Kuntao ===
Kuntao is a Hokkien term for martial arts, in this case referring to those practised by the Tionghoa community of the Indonesian archipelago. Kuntao has a long history in the region dating back to ancient times. Such has been the influence between kuntao and pencak silat that the terms are used interchangeably in some regions. Every Chinese community in Indonesia either has or historically had some style of kuntao, but they were not taught openly until the latter half of the 20th century. Northern and southern Chinese martial arts are represented in kuntao, both from the external and internal schools. Some systems were directly imported from China and underwent little or no changes, such as thaikek (tai chi), pakua (baguazhang or eight-trigram palm) and peh-ho (baihequan or white crane fist). Other popular systems originate from the same states as the Chinese communities who practice them, so that Fujian, Shandong, Kongfu and Guangdong styles dominate.

=== Tarung Derajat ===
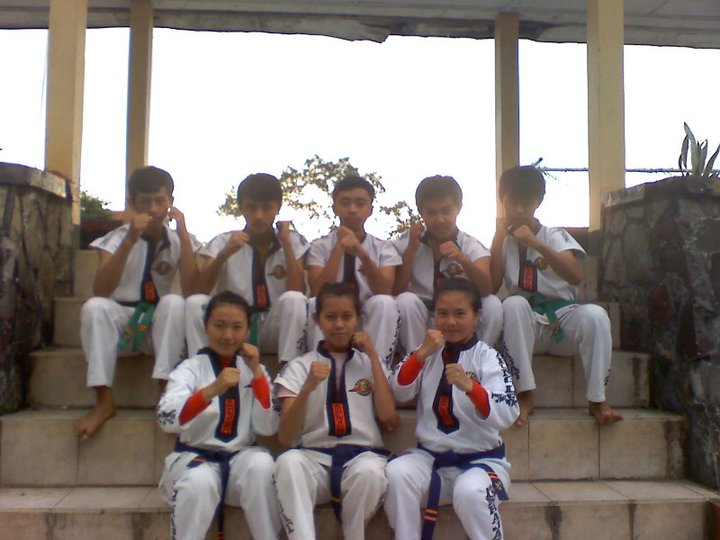
Young Tarung Derajat fighters.

Tarung Derajat is a full-contact martial art created by Haji Achmad Dradjat in Bandung, West Java. Developed in the 1960s, it is a hybrid system which incorporates boxing, grappling and street-fighting. Tarung Derajat is officially recognized as a national sport and used as basic training by the Indonesian Army. Tarung Derajat emphasizes punching and kicking, but is not limited to these, as grappling and sweeping are also included in its training. Practitioners are known simply as petarung meaning "fighter".

Since the 1990s, Tarung Derajat has been refined as a combat sport. In 1998, the Tarung Derajat organization officially became a member of the KONI. Since then, the system has a spot in Pekan Olahraga Nasional, a national multi-sport competition held every four years. The main Tarung Derajat association, KODRAT (Keluarga Olahraga Tarung Derajat), now has sub-organizations in 22 provinces in Indonesia. It was introduced as an exhibition number in the 2011 Southeast Asian Games in Palembang, Indonesia.

=== Caci ===
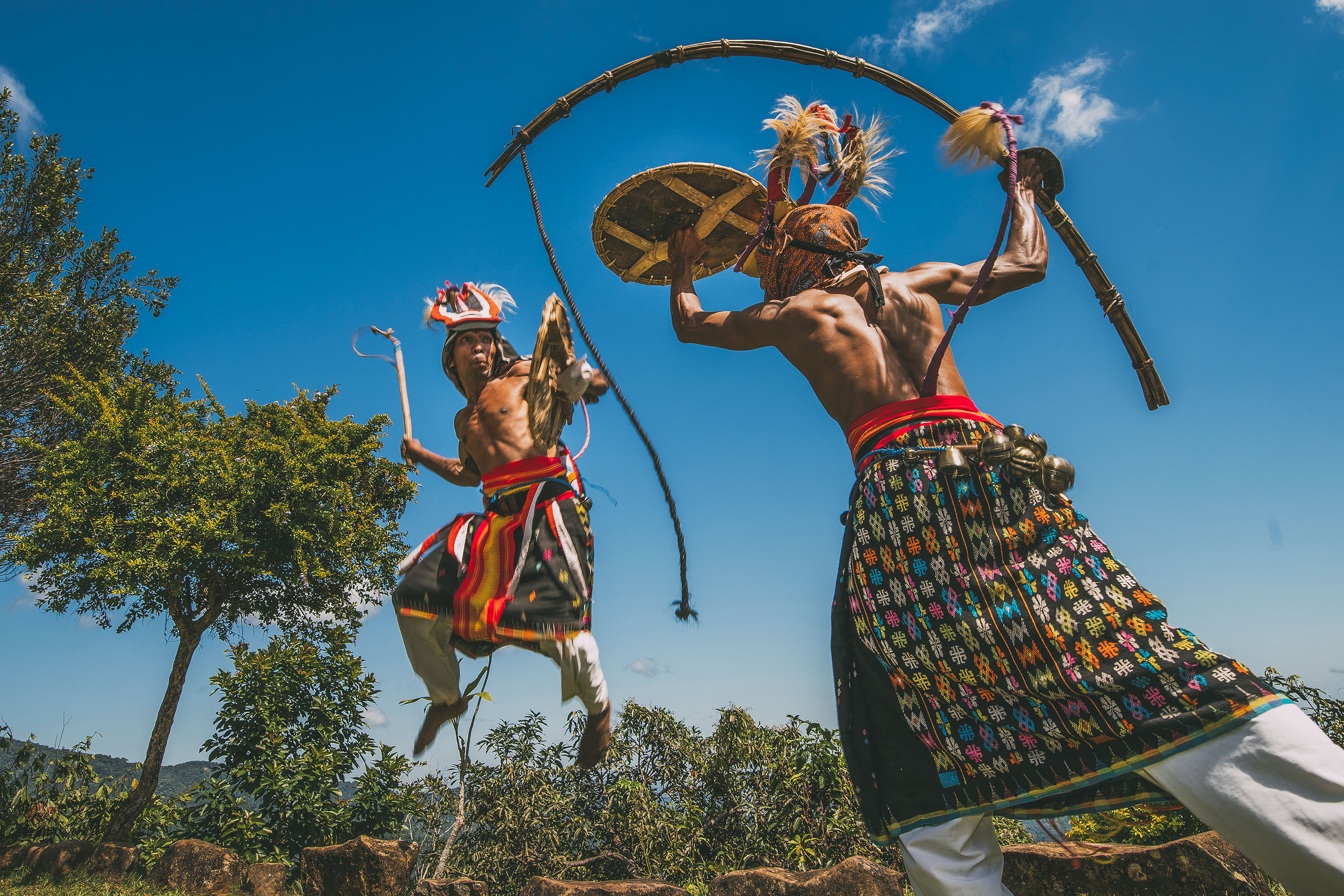
Caci duel using rattan whip as weapon and shield as protection.

Caci (pronounced "chachi") is a form of fighting with a whip or stick. It appears to be indigenous to Flores in East Nusa Tenggara, but it is also practiced in Bali and Lombok. The art is sometimes called cacing or ende in Flores, and larik or kebat in Riung, while in Balinese it is known as ende. The term caci is said to derive from the Manggarai words ca meaning one and ci meaning test, indicating a one-on-one test between the fighters. According to local folklore, caci during festivals began with two brothers who owned a buffalo. When the younger brother fell into a deep hole, the older brother had to slaughter the buffalo to get its skin to help his sibling escape from the hole. The community celebrated this act of love with a festival in which caci matches were held.

There are two types of caci: with a whip (tereng or agang) or a stick (agang). The whip may be either long or short. The short whip corresponds to the cambuk of Java and measures 3 feet in length. The long whip is 5–6 feet long and made from palm stems tied together with either rattan or strips of water buffalo hide. The stick is an undecorated piece of hardwood measuring 1-1.5 yards long and 2 inches in diameter. The shield is of round or elliptical shape. Also traditionally undecorated, it is known as giling or nggiling when made of buffalo hide and perisai kayu when made of wood. Both the whip and the stick form were traditionally practiced in Manggarai Regency, but the stick is rarely seen today. In Bali and Ngada Regency, only the stick form exists.

In a caci match, the two fighters (who are always male) take turns alternately attacking and defending. The attacker is permitted three blows to any part of the anatomy, while the defender attempts to block with his shield. The defender is not allowed to attack while defending, but in the case of whip-fighting the defender may spin the whip above his head to prevent the attacker from closing in. Stick techniques are all swings without any thrusting. Caci at one time served as a form of conflict management within and between villages. Fighters are divided into the host group (ata one) and the challenger group from another village (ata pe’ang or meka landang). Victory is obtained by hitting the opponent's face or head. In former times, championship bouts were held in which the object was to blind the opponent's eye. The winner is required to happily sing a quatrain while the loser replies in a low voice to show despair.

=== Fitimaen ===
Fitimaen is a form of stick-fighting from Buru in the Maluku Islands. The term comes from the Buru word maen which means stick. The maen are either made from rattan or from native hardwood, of which there are hundreds of varieties. Sparring sessions are short to minimise injury, and training is carefully conducted for the same reason. They may be fought with one or a pair of sticks, the length of which depends on personal preference. The first written attestation of fitimaen comes from a British naturalist who recounts that the natives are "adepts at quarterstaff" and that even children "practice with singular skill their cuts and thrusts". While spears and metal knives were also used by the Buru Alifuru for fighting, their preference has always been the fighting staff. Donn F. Draeger calls them the best stick and staff fighters in the whole of Indonesia although not a particularly combative community. The blowpipe (sumping) and bow and arrow could also be used for warfare but are generally hunting implements. Two styles of fitimaen are dominant, one from Namlea and the other from Leksula.

=== Tinju ===
The word tinju means fist-fighting and usually refers to western boxing. In Flores a form of boxing exists which involves four people. As two boxers fight, each is steered by a partner holding their waistband from behind. Attacks may be delivered with the open hand, closed fist, backhand, elbow, or a combination of these. Only the hands, arms and shoulders may be used. Kicks and throws are not permitted. The history of tinju is unknown but it is most common in Bajawa and most likely originated there. In earlier times, each boxer would hold a smooth round stone in one hand and wrap the hand in cloth. Matches are full-contact and victory is determined on points.

== Related practices ==
The following are related martial practices including combat sports, duels, ritual battles, mock combat, and war dances. All are exclusive to males unless otherwise stated.

=== Pasola ===
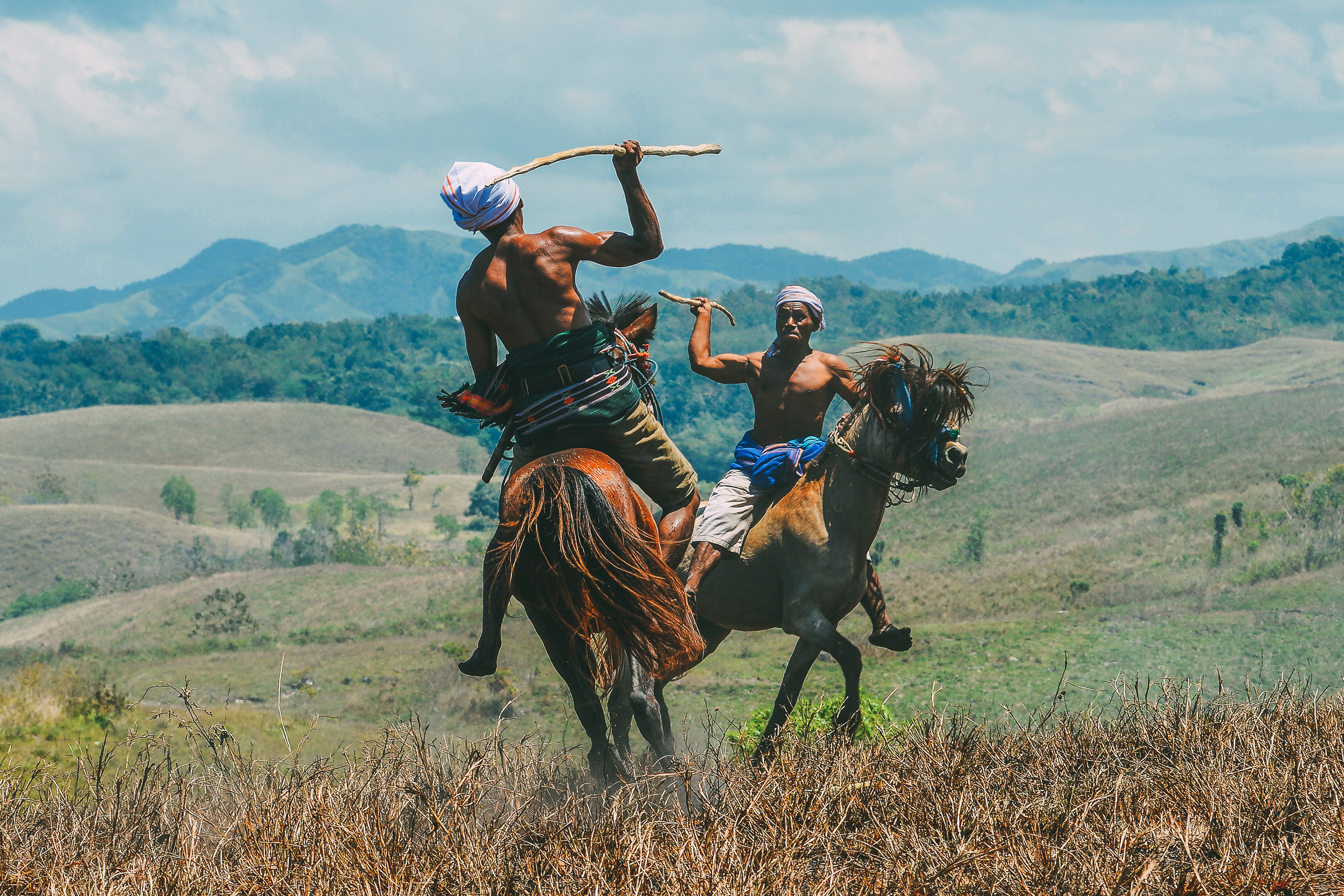
Pasola is a tradition of war between two opposing camps, chasing after throwing a wooden javelin at an opponent

Pasola is a form of mounted spear-fighting from western Sumba. The word pasola comes from the local word for spear and derives from the Sanskrit sula. According to legend, pasola originated with a woman from the village of Waiwuang. When her husband - a local leader - left home for an extended period, she believed him to be dead and eloped with a new lover from another village. After her husband returned, the woman still chose to stay with her new lover, and the two were married. To forget their leader's sadness, the people of Waiwuang held the festival of pasola. Originally the participants rode horses and threw spears at each other in an attempt to spill blood to the ground, as a way of thanking the ancestors for a successful harvest and ensuring another prosperous rice harvest. The ritual changed over time into more of a mock battle. The spear tips are now blunt and their metal tips removed. Whereas it was once considered an honour to die during pasola, only accidental deaths occasionally occur today. The human and horse blood which used to drench the field is now solely from sacrificed pigs, dogs, and chickens. Armed police are kept on guard to prevent fights from breaking out. Beginning in the 2010s, pasola has been promoted as a "game" for visiting spectators. The event traditionally begins when a certain kind of sea worm swims to shore, signifying the end of the wet season and the beginning of crop-planting. Today, the elders decide on the date in advance for the sake of tourists. Pasola is always held for four weeks in February and March.

=== Debus ===
Debus is a martial art that shows immunity with sharp weapons, this is martial arts originating from the Sundanese people in the provinces of Banten and West Java.

=== Payuq ===
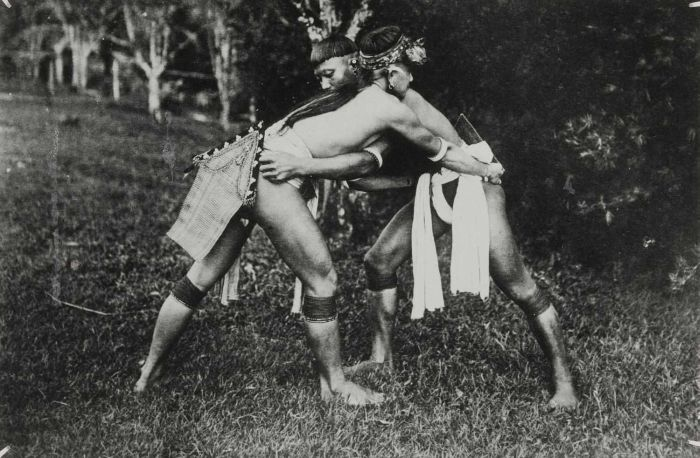
A payuq match

Payuq is the traditional Dayak form of wrestling, particularly native to the Kenyah people of East Kalimantan. The word payuq derives from the Sanskrit term bahu-yuddha and means "physical fighting". Matches are held annually during the harvest festival. The aim of a payuq match is to lift and slam the opponent to the ground. Physical strength and technique are the deciding factors in payuq. The neighbouring people of Kutai practice a sumo-like form of wrestling called bebintih meaning "mutual tackle". Matches take place in dried rice paddies after being harvested and a circle is set in the centre of the field as a ring. The aim is to push the opponent out of the circle or knock them to the ground. Wrestlers - always male - hold their opponent's loincloth and shove their shoulders against each other while using their legs to trip the opponent.

=== Sisemba ===
Sisemba is a kick-fighting activity practised by the Toraja of South Sulawesi. While sisemba is its formal name, it is also known as semba or sempak. Native to the Batan and Pangalla areas in the North Toraja Regency, it is today mainly seen in the Toraja cultural centre of Rantepao. The ritual of mass kick-fighting is usually performed as part of the rice harvest festival in Tana Toraja villages. According to tradition, sisemba is a prerequisite for the next successful harvest. In the practice of sisemba, hundreds of participants from two villages join hands and form lines of two or more people. They may be linked by the arms or by clasping hands. The line is not necessarily straight but may take the form of a V-shape, an inverted V-formation, a wedge, a circular arc either concave or convex, or any other shape. Once joined in line, all participants must be linked except the men on the ends of each line. Once the opposing ranks come within range, they kick at each other in an attempt to knock players out of the opponent's line. A divided line is then overwhelmed by the superior numbers of the opposing line, who manoeuvre and surround stragglers. Smaller lines are however capable of more agile manoeuvres, such as sending the player at the end of a line flying through the air completely off the ground, and then pulling them back in a whip-like manner after they've struck the opponent. Any sort of kicks are allowed and any part of the body may be targeted so long as the link to the line is maintained. An individual who has been knocked out of line may get up and rejoin their line; until rejoining he is off-limits to the attacks of the opposing team. In earlier days, such an individual would be kicked into submission or until unconscious.

Sisemba originated as a form of mass defence in which every man in the village repelled invaders. It served its purpose well enough that no form of pencak silat, wrestling, or any other unarmed fighting art exists in the Toraja culture. Sisemba was also used as a way of settling disputes between kampung. Victory was obtained simply by reducing the numbers of the opposing team through injury. Today it is a harvest-time festivity, performed on harvested rice fields. Matches last for several hours each day over a period of weeks during the harvest season. The winner is decided based on the superiority of technique but injuries are still frequent, particularly to the face. To ensure that the match runs smoothly, the village elders act as supervisors. If a participant or a pair of them was deemed to be too violent, the village elders will separate them from the crowd.

=== Cakalele ===
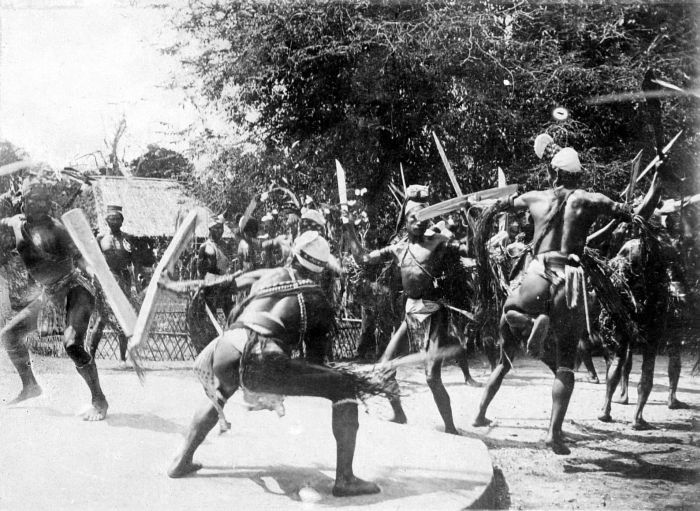
Cakalele war-dance of Seram.

The cakelele is a male war-dance practised by the aboriginals of North and Central Maluku. Hybrid forms also exist in Sulawesi, Timor, and the Tanimbar Islands. Mentioned in native legends, it originated as a way for the warriors to celebrate after a successful raid. From the age of sixteen, village boys would study and work for 3–5 years with the kakehan, the men's secret society. The art of combat formed part of their education, as was the cakalele. While not an actual martial art, the dance has preserved some techniques and the full range of aboriginal weaponry, making it greatly important in the study of Indonesia's native fighting methods. Backed by the rhythm of the drum and gong (tifa) and fife (sulin), two opposing captains engage in mock-combat with a spear (sanokat) and long knife (lopu). Supporting warriors wield long knives and a narrow wooden shield known as salawaku.

=== Mekare-kare ===
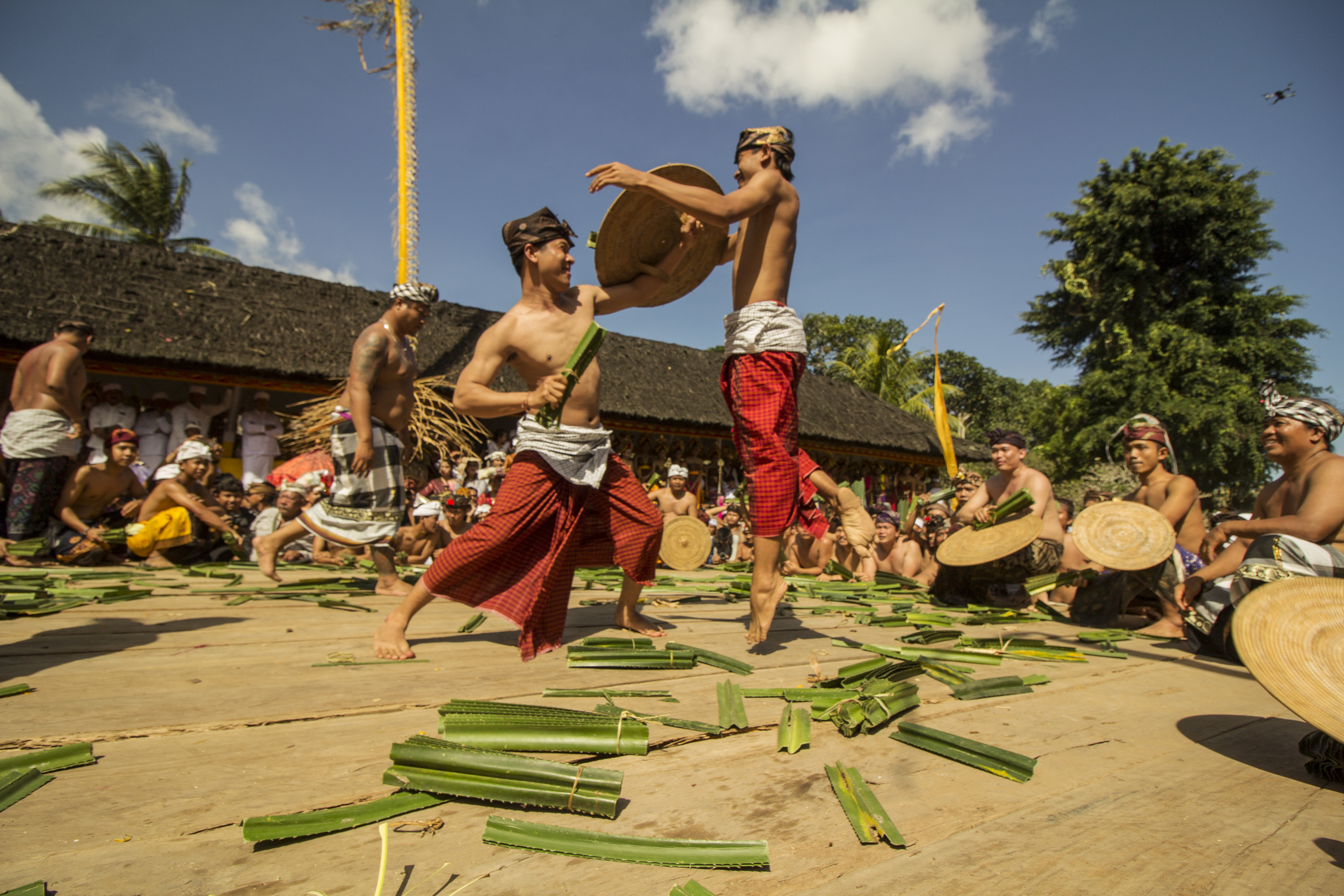
Mekare-kare pandan battle in Tenganan village, Karangasem, Bali.

Mageret pandan is a Balinese method of fighting using a sharp, thorny pandan club paired with a shield. It is sometimes called makare-kare in Balinese and known as perang pandan in Indonesian, literally meaning "pandan battle". Mageret pandan is practiced by the Bali Aga population of Tenganan village in Karangasem Regency. The people of Tenganan are devotees of the deity Indra. To honour Indra as a warrior god, many major religious festivals in Tenganan involve a ritualistic battle.

The tradition of mageret pandan is said to have originated with King Maya Denawa who claimed himself a god greater than the entire Hindu pantheon. He forbade the people from performing their religious ceremonies, which angered the gods. Indra himself fought and defeated Maya Denawa for his blasphemy, and their battle was commemorated through mageret pandan.

Today it is done as a ritual to honour the gods and the ancestors. The weapon used in mageret pandan is a 15 cm club made by tying 10-15 leaves of pandan (Pandanus amaryllifolius) together. Each of the leaves is edged with small sharp thorns. The shield is a rattan buckler. Techniques are mostly swinging strikes, but grappling is used when in-fighting. Participants compete shirtless, wearing only a sarong (kamen) and traditional headdress (udeng). According to tradition, the mageret pandan is compulsory for Tenganan males. For the young, it serves as a rite of passage into manhood; children as young as seven have participated.

=== Kabasaran ===
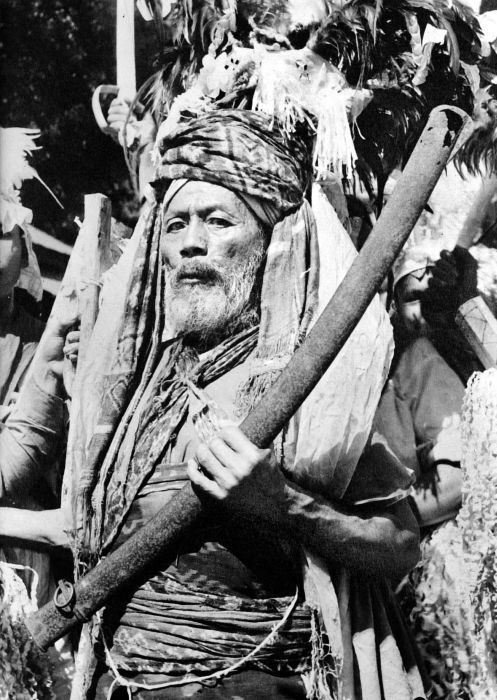
Kabasaran performer

Kabasaran is a Minahasan war dance from North Sulawesi, performed by several men clad in red. Kabasaran dancers were traditionally farmers or guards who served as waranei (warriors) when the village was attacked. The waranei status along with their weapon is inherited from father to son.

The basic structure of the dance consists of nine dance moves (jurus) using either the sword (santi) or spear (wengkouw). The footwork pattern consists of two steps to the left and another two to the right. Dancers are known as kawasalan indicating a pair of fighter cocks. The dance is accompanied by percussion instruments such as gongs, drums or kolintang called pa 'wasalen.

=== Sitobo Lalang Lipa ===
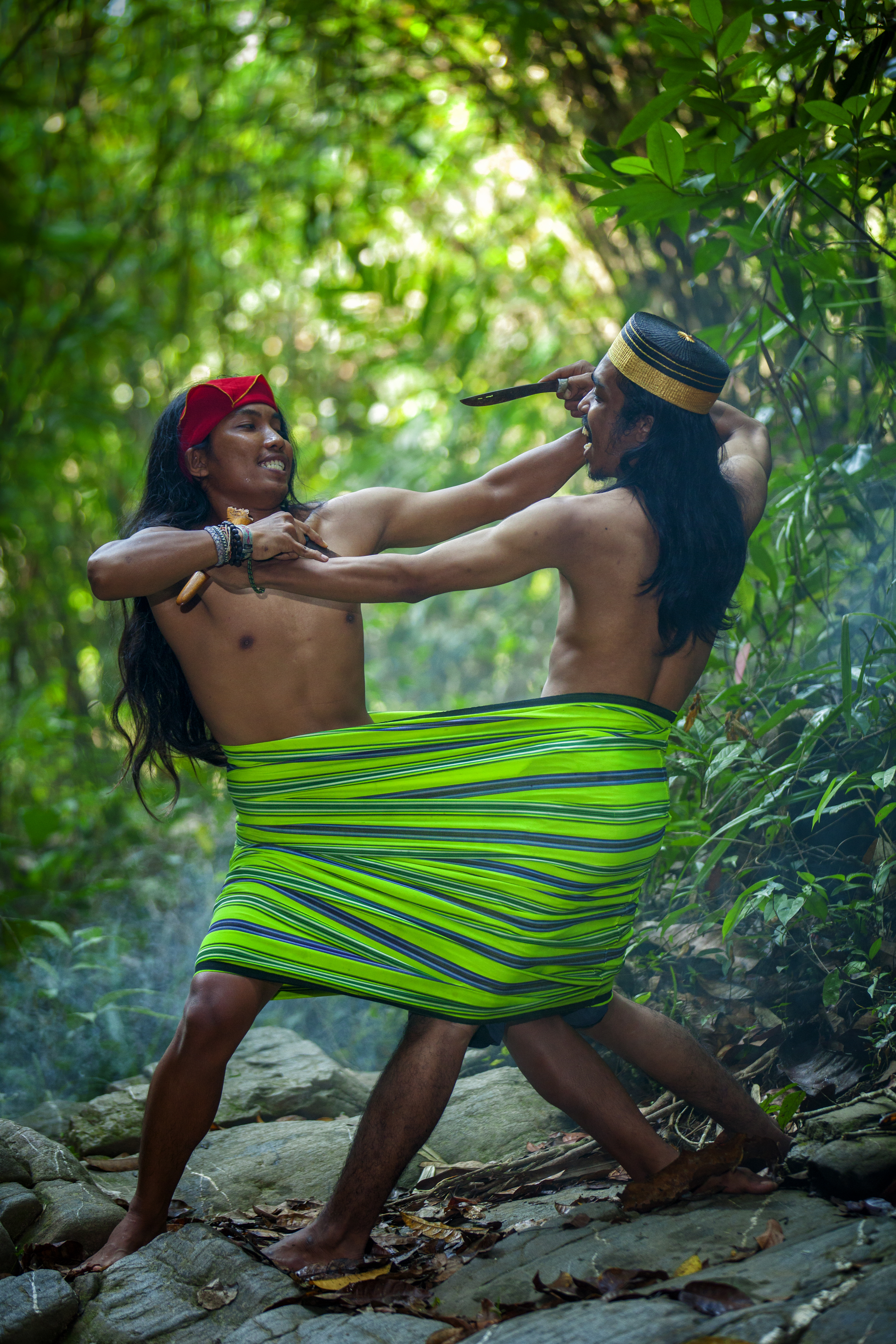
Reenactment of sitobo lalang lipa or tarung sarung, dueling in a sarong using badik, found in Bugis culture in the past.

Sitobo lalang lipa or Sigajang laleng lipa is the Bugis term for a type of knife duel formerly practiced by pesilat of the Bugis-Makassar communities and also in Batak tribes. The challenger stands with a loosened sarong around him and invites the other man to step into the sarong. Knives in their right hands, the two duellists fight to the death within the confines of the sarong. This violent method was used for conflict resolution in Bugis-Makassar community in the past. If two men having disputes that can not be resolved through parley, their honour has been trespassed, and none of them admitted their mistakes, the only way to resolve this dispute is through a deadly duel in a sarong.

In Bugis culture, there are three important concept that should be uphold; Ade (adat) or traditional customs, Siri (shame or self worth) or in this case one's pride and honor should be protected fiercely to avoid the shame of humiliation, and Pesse (compassion). In Bugis culture, the Siri aspect is the most dominant, thus conflict regarding one's honour might occur.

This method of fighting originated in ancient India where the duellists fought with knives in their right hands while their left hands were tied together. It is unknown in what part of Southeast Asia this duel was first introduced, but it was practiced in Thailand where the fighters boxed each other with the right hands. Duelling within a sarong rather than tying the hands together appears to be unique to Indonesia. Among the Bugis and Mangkasara, the weapon used in sitobo lalang lipa is the badik. The Batak however use another type of knife known as the raut. Duelling is no longer practiced today, but reenactments of sitobo lalang lipa are still performed at cultural shows in Indonesia.

== Weapons ==
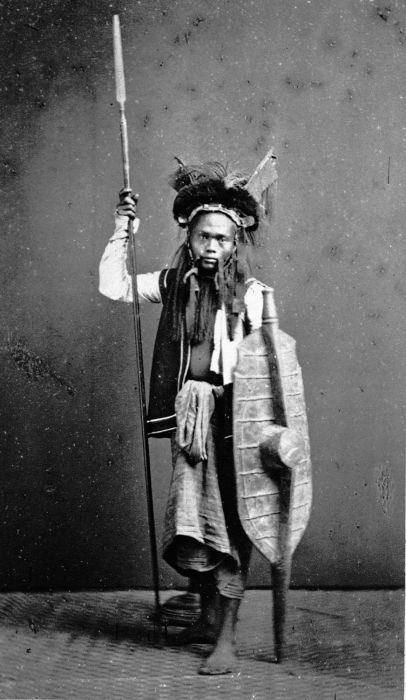
Nias warrior armed with spear and shield

- Badik: a knife or dagger developed by the Bugis and Makassar people of southern Sulawesi
- Chabang: short-handled trident, literally meaning "branch"
- Cambuk/Pecut: whip, might be made from various materials; rattan, bamboo, fabrics, leather to stingray's tail
- Celurit/ Sabit: a sickle, commonly used in farming, cultivation and harvesting of crops.
- Kerambit/ Kuku Macan: a blade shaped like a tiger's claw
- Kipas: traditional folding fan preferably made of hardwood or iron.
- Klewang: a type of single-edge longsword with a protruding notch near its tip.
- Kris: a dagger, often with a wavy blade made by folding different types of metal together and then washing it in acid.
- Kujang: Sundanese blade roughly shaped like a deer's antler.
- Parang/ Golok: machete commonly used in daily tasks such as cutting through forest brush.
- Pedang: sword, either straight or curved
- Rencong/Tumbuk Lada: slightly curved Aceh and Minang dagger, literally meaning "pepper grinder".
- Samping/Linso: silk sash worn around the waist or shoulder, used in locking techniques and for defence against blades.
- Sundang: a double edge Bugis sword, often wavy-bladed
- Tameng/ Perisai: shield made of hardwood, weaved rattan, or sometimes metal.
- Tombak/ Lembing: spear or javelin made of bamboo, steel or wood that sometimes has horsehair attached near the blade.
- Toya: rod or staff made from wood, steel or bamboo.
- Trisula: a trident or 3-pronged spear

== In popular culture ==
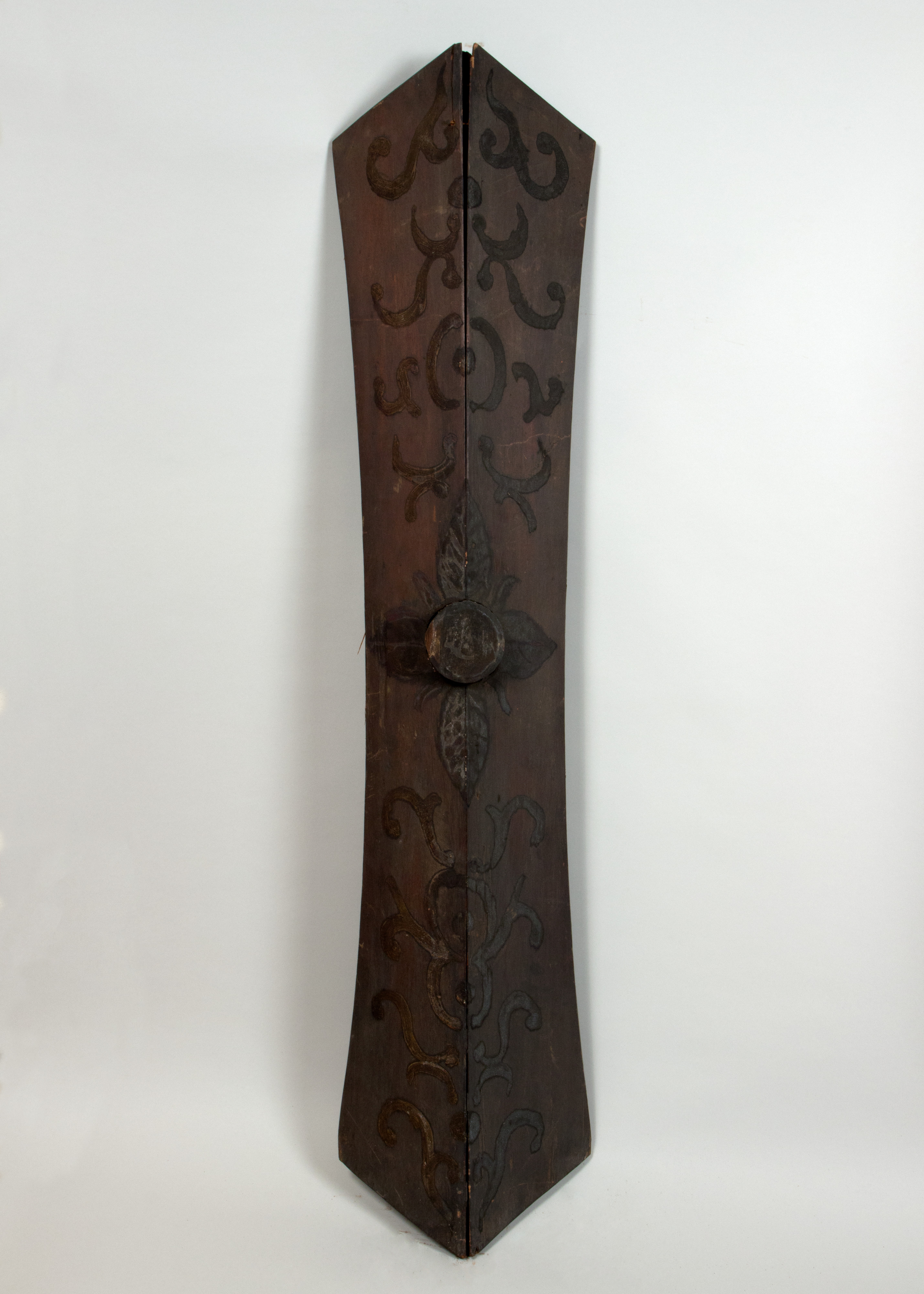
Shield from Indonesian, Sulawesi; 18th–19th century

Indonesia has showcased its martial arts in cinema, novels, comics, theatre, and TV series for decades. The term silat as a genre refers specifically to historical stories involving martial artists. These need not necessarily feature the silat discipline itself, but also includes Chinese wuxia and Japanese jidaigeki. The silat genre began as an oral and theatrical tradition before first being written in the form of medieval hikayat. The modern silat novel was a 20th-century evolution of the literary silat genre, giving rise to comics and eventually movies. Early silat films (as with many contemporary TV series today) placed less emphasis on the actual fights and more on drama, resulting in poor depictions of the art. This changed in the 1980s due to the popularity of radio shows featuring pencak silat experts in the old Indonesian kingdoms of Pajajaran and Majapahit circa the 14-15th century. Historical epics such as Saur Sepuh, Tutur Tinular and Misteri Gunung Merapi have been adapted both for TV and film. Indonesian cinema differentiates this from modern action films or laga. The latter may or may not include traditional fighting styles, but the modern setting makes it distinct from the silat genre proper.

While Indonesian movies and TV series have always had a large following in neighbouring Malaysia and Singapore, it was the 2009 film Merantau that brought international attention to the cinematic genre and pencak silat in general. The film had a mostly positive reaction from cinema critics and generated enough interest for the lead actor to follow up with The Raid: Redemption in 2011 which received international acclaim. Its sequel The Raid 2: Berandal was similarly well-received but drew much criticism for its extreme gore, leading to the film being banned in Malaysia.

== See also ==
- Styles of silat
- Military history of Indonesia
