= Latigo y Daga =

Filipino martial art

Latigo y Daga ("Whip and Dagger" in Spanish) is a Filipino martial art which focuses on the use of flexible weapons, particularly whips. It combines elements from a number of martial arts found in Malaysia, the Philippines, and Indonesia.

The Latigo y Daga system was formulated in 1987 by Tom Meadows. Through his research and experience working with various whips in conjunction with multiple martial arts systems and styles, he formed Latigo y Daga and developed a standardized vocabulary for whip techniques. The primary aspects of Latigo y Daga are the use of the 4-ft. whip, the combination of using a dagger with whip, and using the empty hand with a whip.

Some of the more prominent practitioners of Latigo y Daga are Dan Inosanto, Ron Balicki and Anthony De Longis.

== See also ==
- Eskrima
- Filipino Martial Arts
- Buntot Pagi
- Whip fighting

== Publications ==
- Filipino Fighting Whip : Advanced Training Methods and Combat Applications by Tom Meadows ISBN 1-58160-477-7
