= Kanta (shield) =

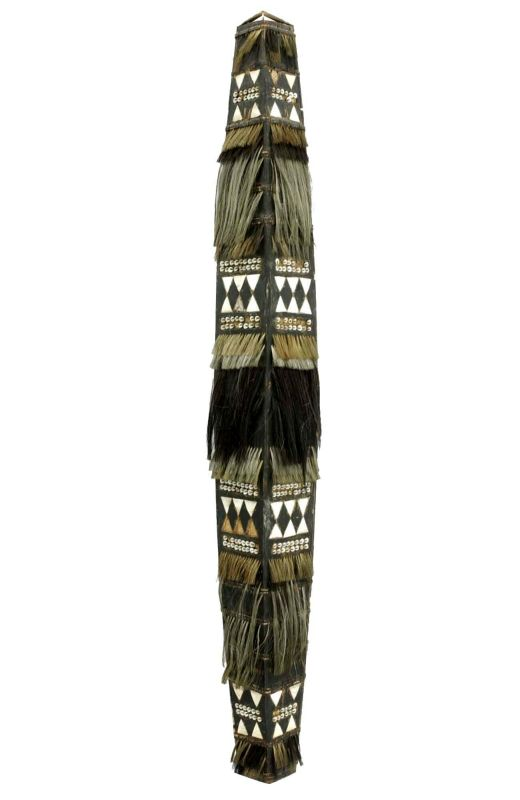
- A Kanta shield, pre 1940.
- Type: Shield
- Place of origin: Central Sulawesi & South Sulawesi, Indonesia

Service history
- Used by: Toraja people, Pamona people

Specifications
- Length: 110 cm

The Kanta is a traditional shield of the Toraja and Pamona people of Tana Toraja Regency, South Sulawesi and Poso Regency, Central Sulawesi, Indonesia respectively.

== Description ==
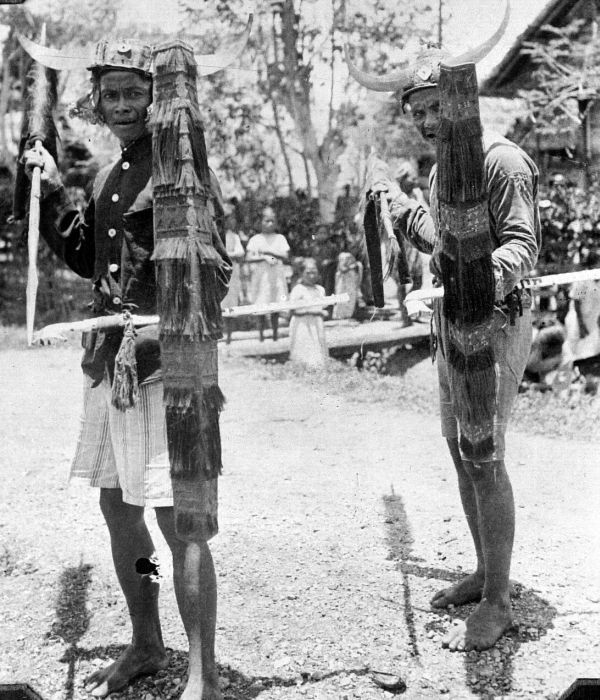
Cakalele performers from Donggala

It is a long slender shield, V-shaped over its entire length. It tapers somewhat towards the lower and upper parts. It is richly decorated with goat's hair dyed white, black and red, which are worked on horizontal tufts and inlaid with small shells or white bone. These tufts of white, red and black colored hair are mounted in overlapping rows.
