= Kabasaran =

Indonesian traditional tribal war dance

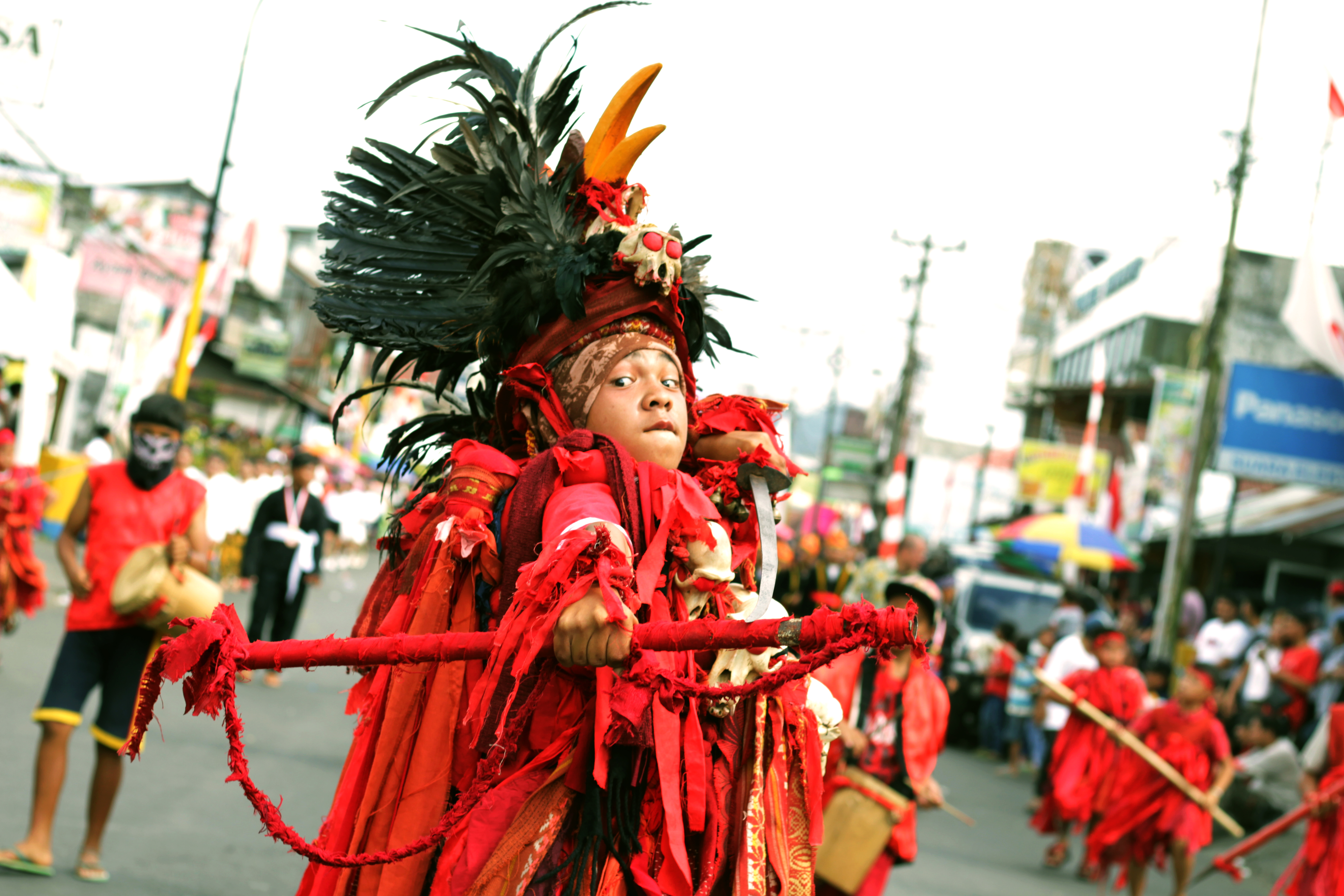
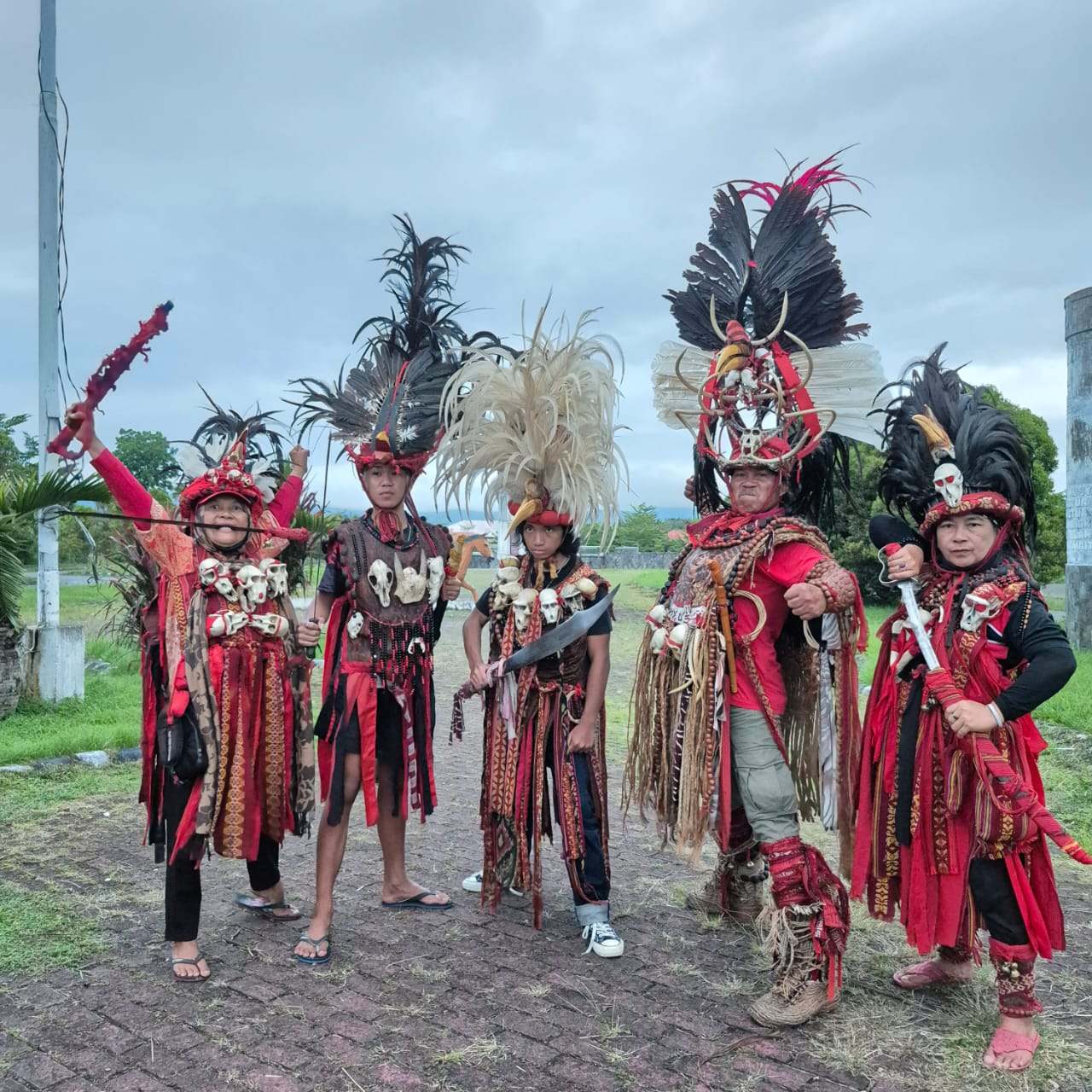
- Kabasaran dancers in North Sulawesi
- Focus: Self-defense
- Hardness: Full-contact, semi-contact, light-contact
- Country of origin: Indonesia (North Sulawesi)
- Olympic sport: No

Kabasaran is a traditional Minahasan martial art and war dance from North Sulawesi in Indonesia. It is performed by several men clad in red costumes, wielding a sword with a shield or a spear. The dancers are called kawasalan, which implies imitating like a pair of fighter cocks. The word kabasaran is derived from kawasalan, which is related to the Sakalele dance, a traditional war dance from the Moluccas. It was simplified and incorporated moves from Quadrille dance.

The dancers work daily as farmers and guards of the Minahasan villages, but serve as waranei (warriors) if the village is attacked. According to Minahasan custom, the weapons and status of waranei are hereditary. The kabasaran dance is performed exclusively by men of the Waranei lineage.

In general, the basic structure of the dance consists of nine movements (jurus) using the sword (santi) or spear (wengkouw), also the stance moves which consists of two steps to the left, and two steps to the right. The dance is accompanied by percussion instruments such as gongs, drums, or kolintang called pa 'wasalen.

== Gallery ==
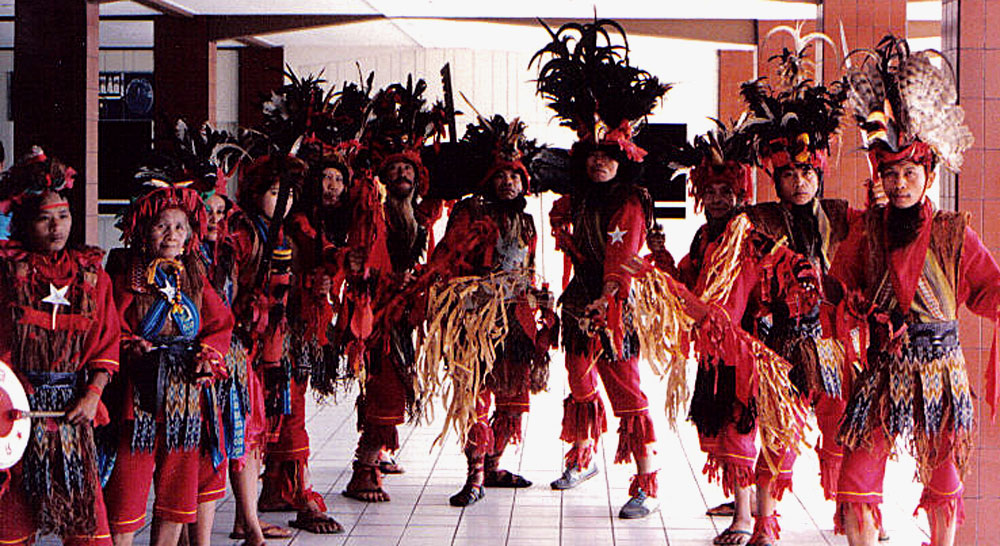
Traditional clothes worn by kabasaran dancers

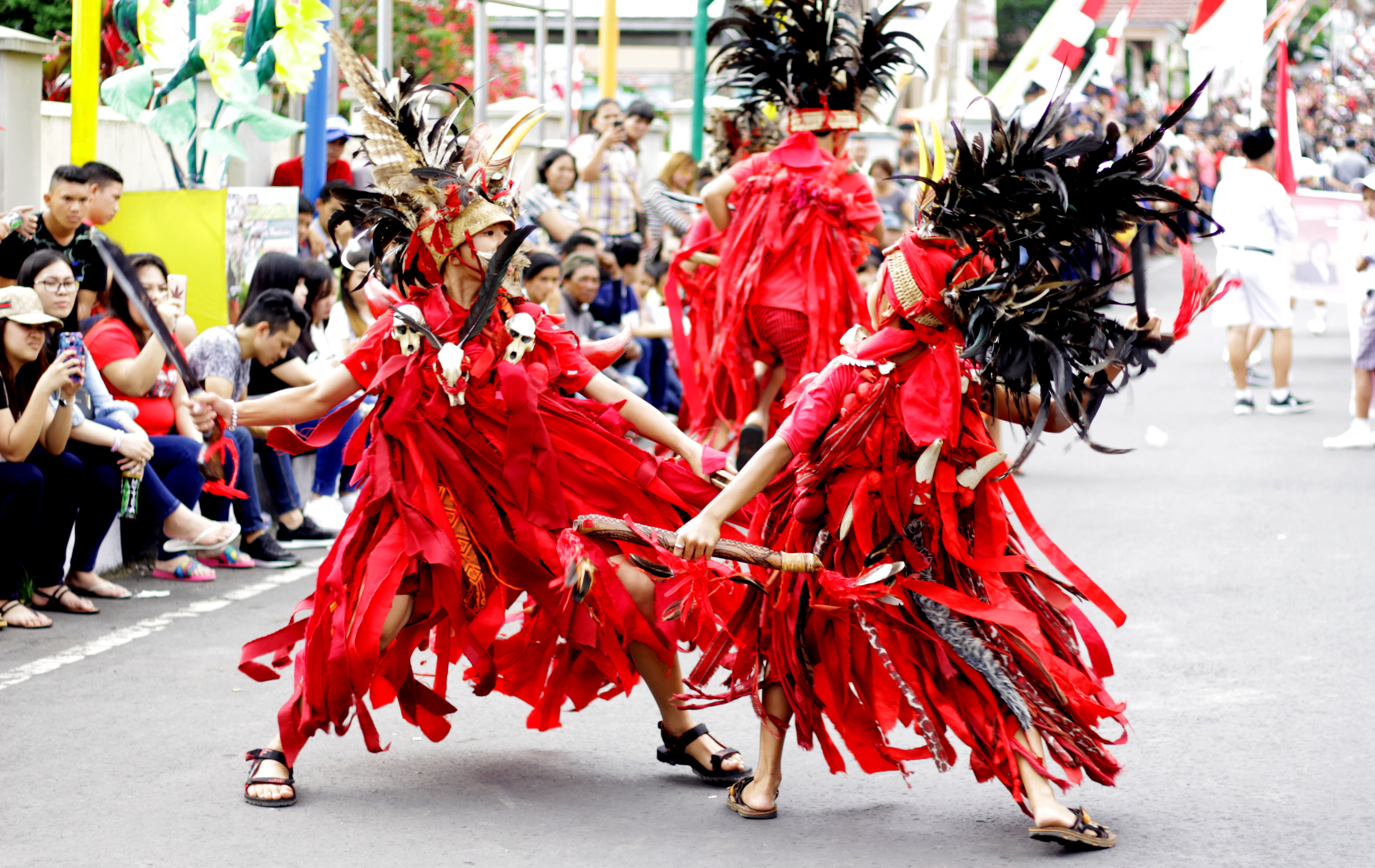
Kabasaran dancers use traditional weapons

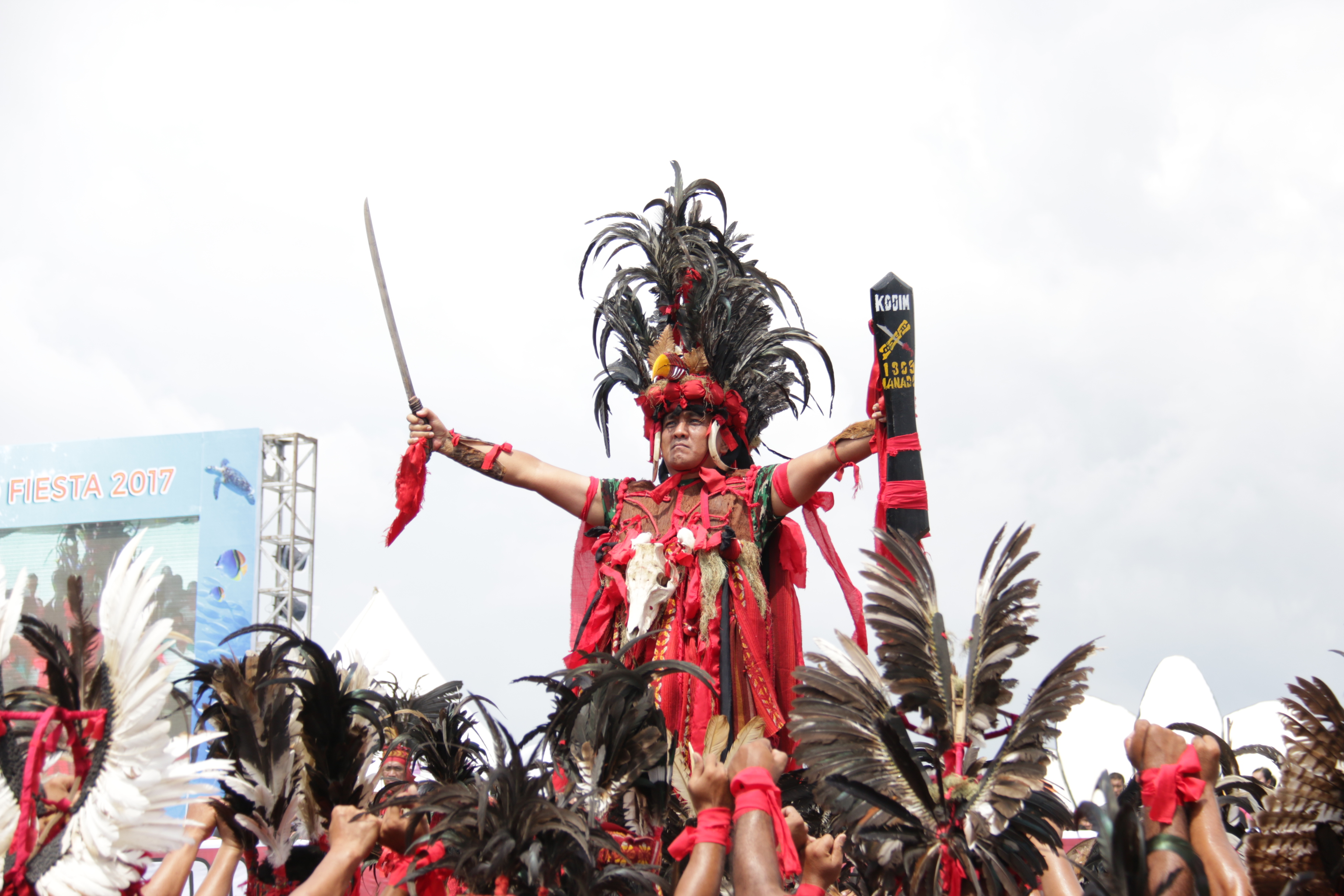
Kabasaran dance performance at an event in North Sulawesi

== See also ==
- Cakalele dance
- Indonesian martial arts
- Dance in Indonesia
