= Whip fighting =

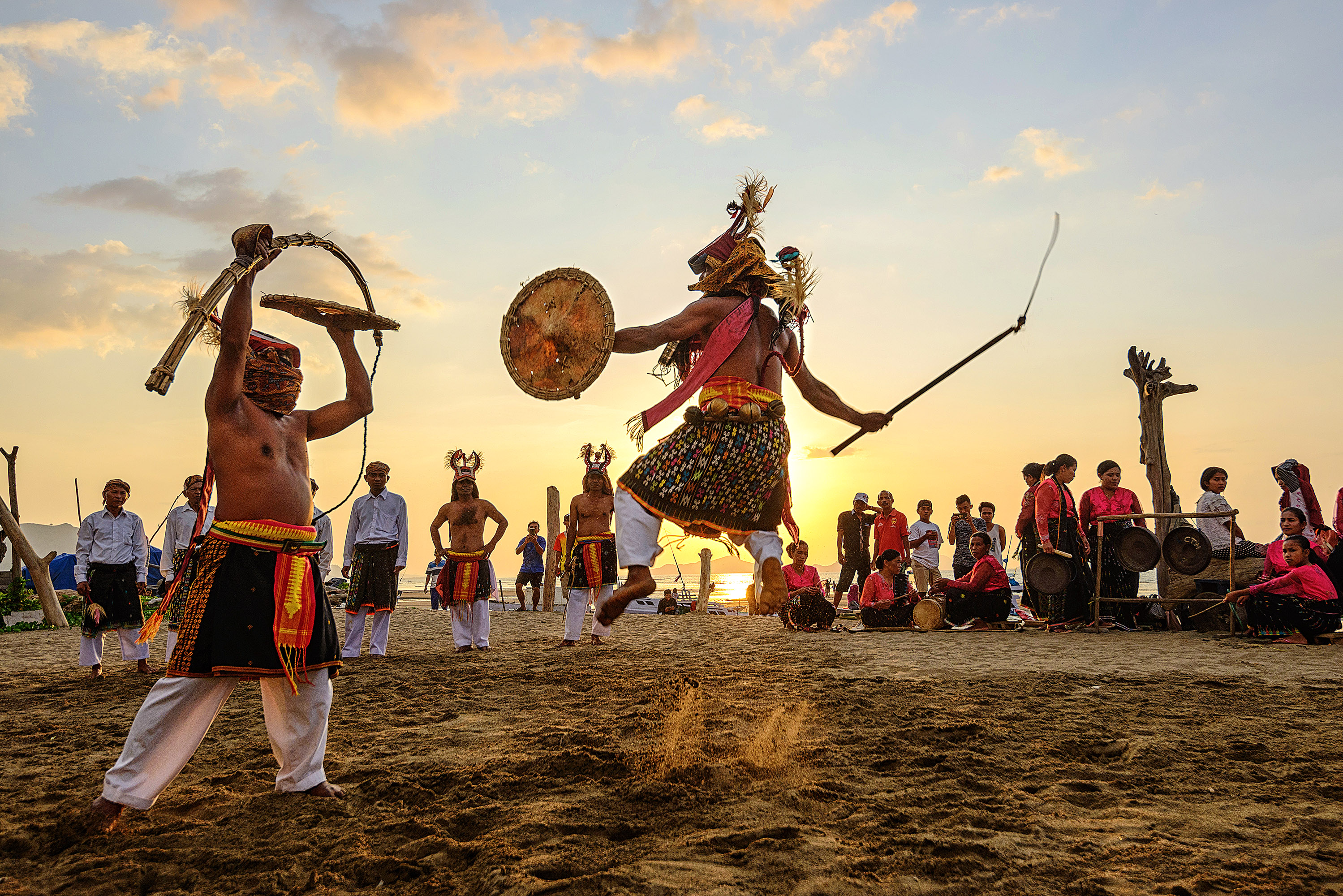
Caci whip fighting is one of the traditional fighting arts of the Manggarai community on Flores Island, East Nusa Tenggara, Indonesia.

Whip fighting can be done as a ritual, a show, or a sport, the latter also known as whip boxing.

David Hicks describes caci, a ritual tournament of whip fighting among the Manggarai people of Indonesia performed on various traditional and religious occasions (although, as the author remarks, the impact of tourism has skewed the picture). The origins of caci may lie in ancient training of warriors.

Latigo y Daga literally translates to Whip and Dagger in Spanish. It is a Filipino martial art, formulated in 1987, which focuses on the use of flexible weapons, particularly whips.

Whip boxing has become an emerging event in Australia, along with whipcracking and other Australian traditional shows and competitions. It was created and promoted by an Australian whipmaker Gayle Nemeth. Whipboxing combines the category of targetwork of whipcracking with the person-to-person competition: the points are earned for hitting the face (covered by protective gear).

Nikolai Leskov in his novel The Enchanted Wanderer (1873) describes an old Central Asian bidding custom. In order to avoid unreasonably high prices, the two highest bidders resolve the issue by a whip fight: while holding each other by left hands, they lash each other in turns until one gives up.
