= Cakalele dance =

Indonesian traditional war dance

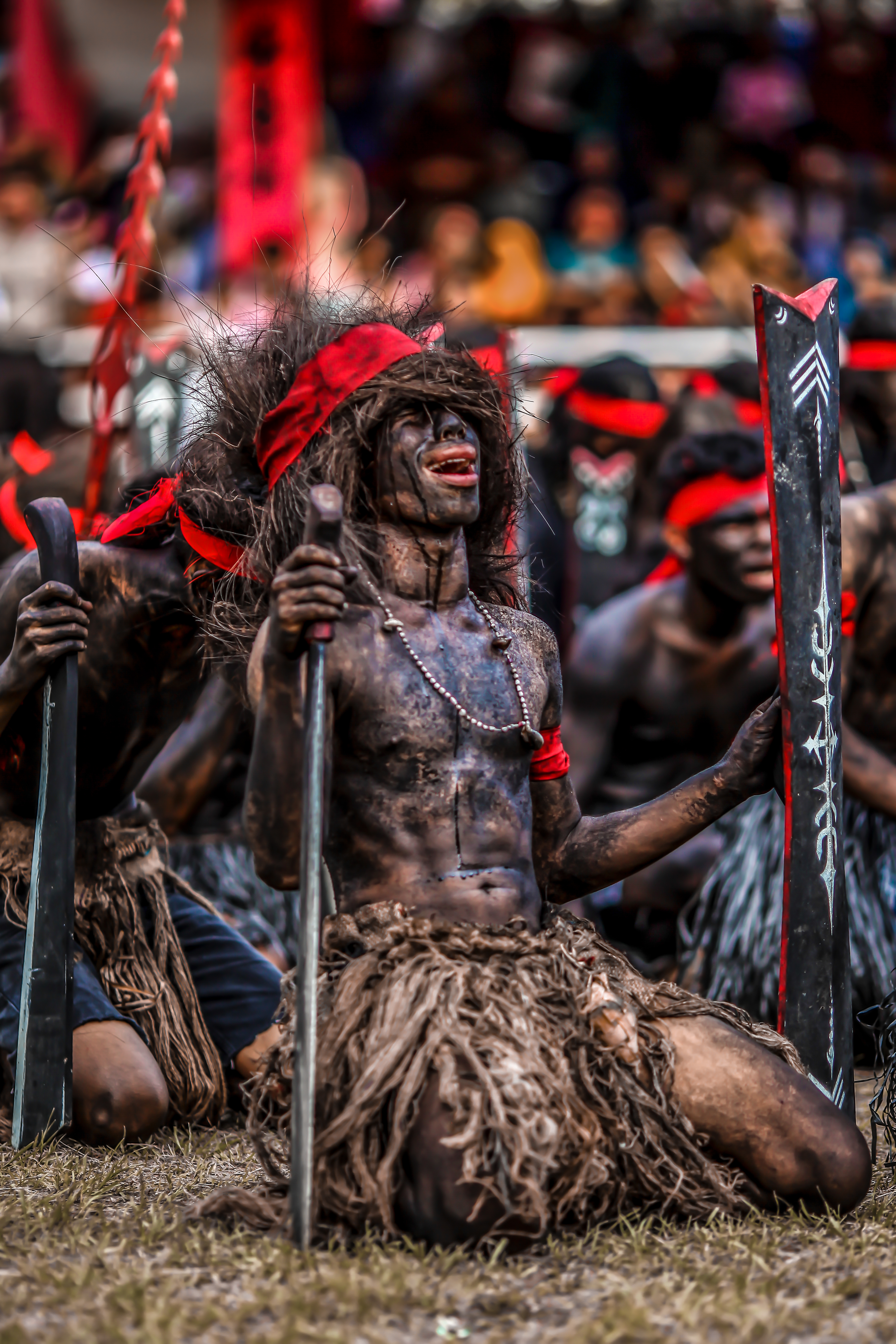
- Cakalele dance performance
- Native name: Tari cakalele
- Inventor: Eastern Indonesia
- Origin: Indonesia

Cakalele dance (pronounced "cha-ka-leh-leh", spelled tjakalele by the Dutch) is a war dance from the Maluku Islands in Indonesia. Hybrid versions also exist among the natives of Sulawesi (Kabasaran or Sakalele dance of the Minahasan), East Nusa Tenggara (Abui Cakalele from Alor), the Tanimbar Islands, and Fakfak (Mbaham-Matta Cakalele Mbreh). The dance is performed by men, two of whom represent opposing captains or leaders while the others are the warriors supporting them. After an opening ritual, the captains engage in a mock-duel with a spear (sanokat) and a long parang (lopu) while their supporters use a lopu in the right hand and a long shield in the left hand. The shield is referred to as a salawaku, or by a local name such as the Tobelo o dadatoko. The cakalele originated as a way for the warriors to celebrate after a successful raid. Dancers dress in full warrior costume and are backed by the rhythm of the drum (tifa), gong, and fife (suling).

== Gallery ==
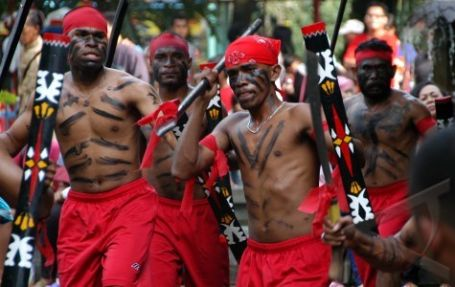
Cakalele dancers wearing traditional clothes

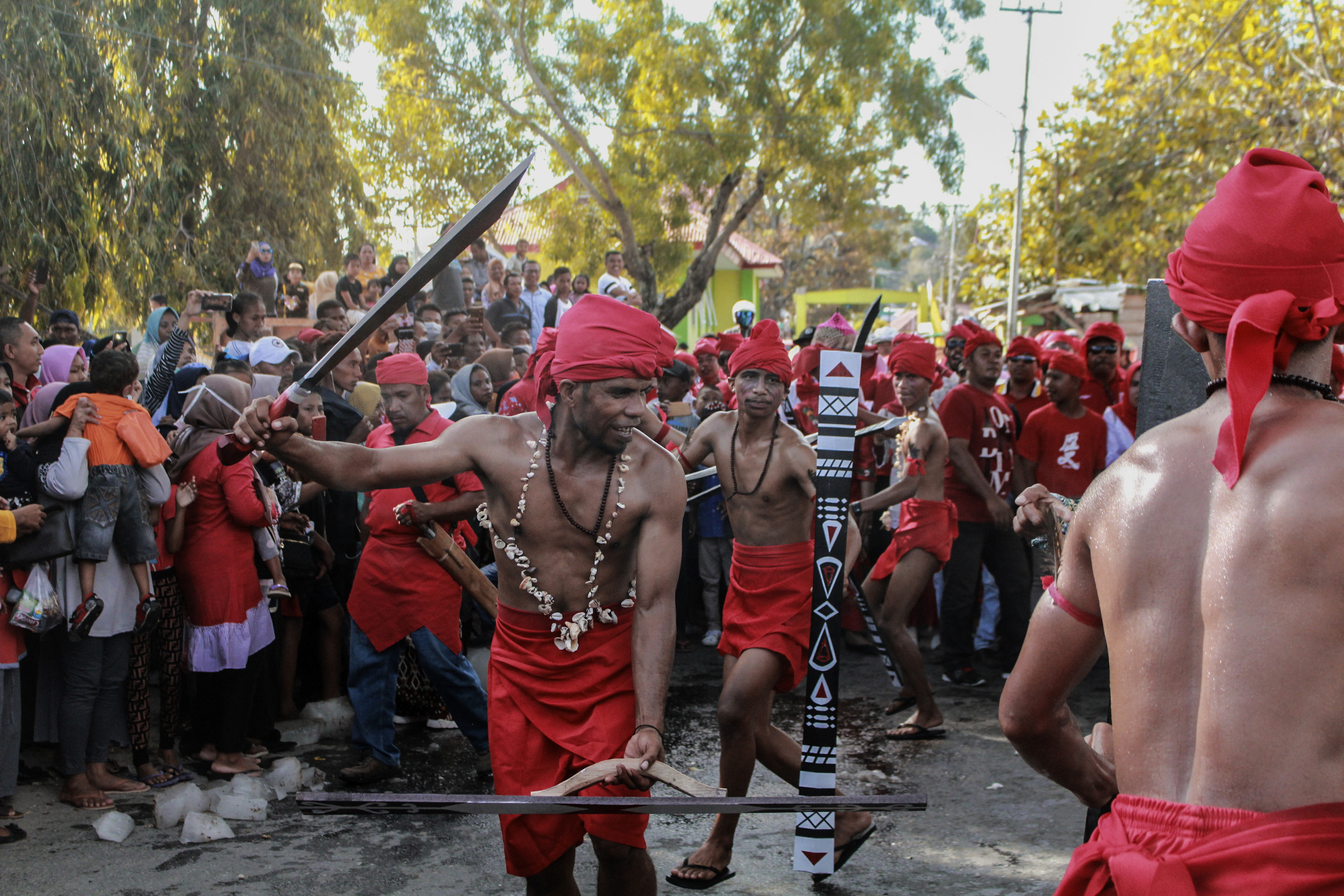
Cakalele dance performances in Maluku

Salawaku, the shield used in performances

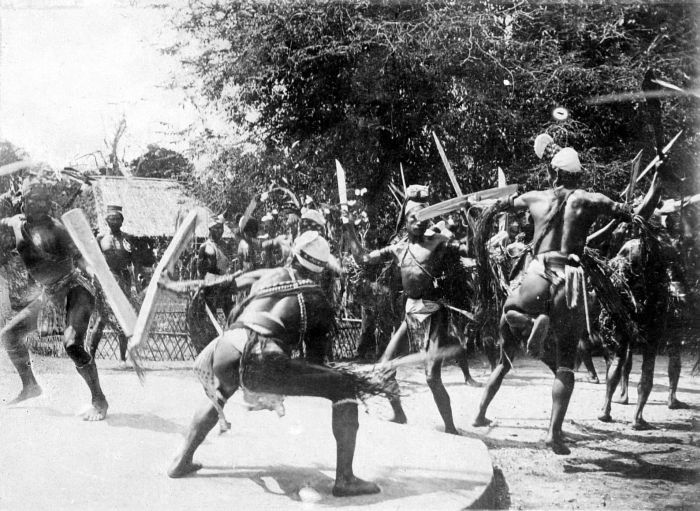
Cakalele dance performances in the 1900s from Seram

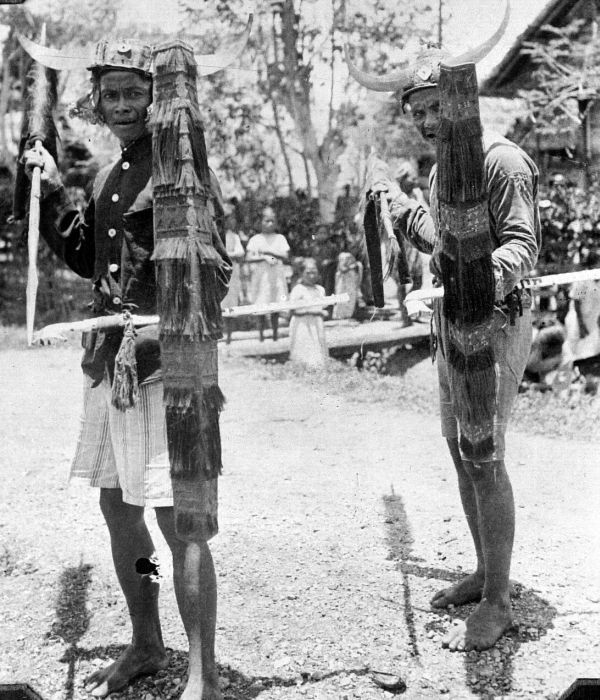
Two cakalele dancers holding kanta shields from Donggala Regency, Central Sulawesi

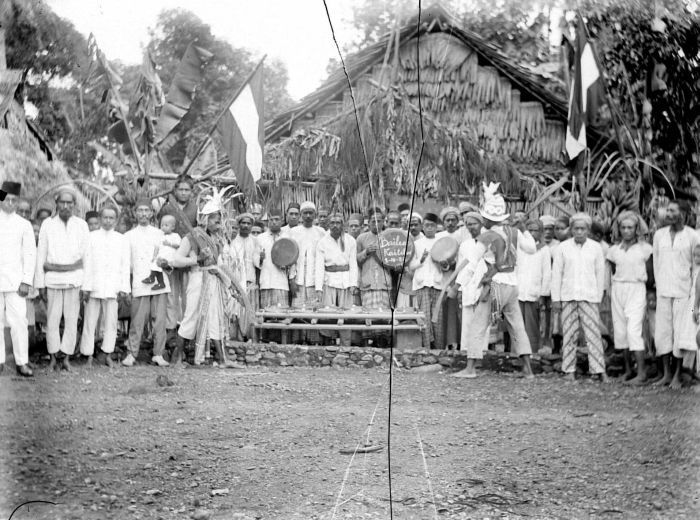
Cakalele performance

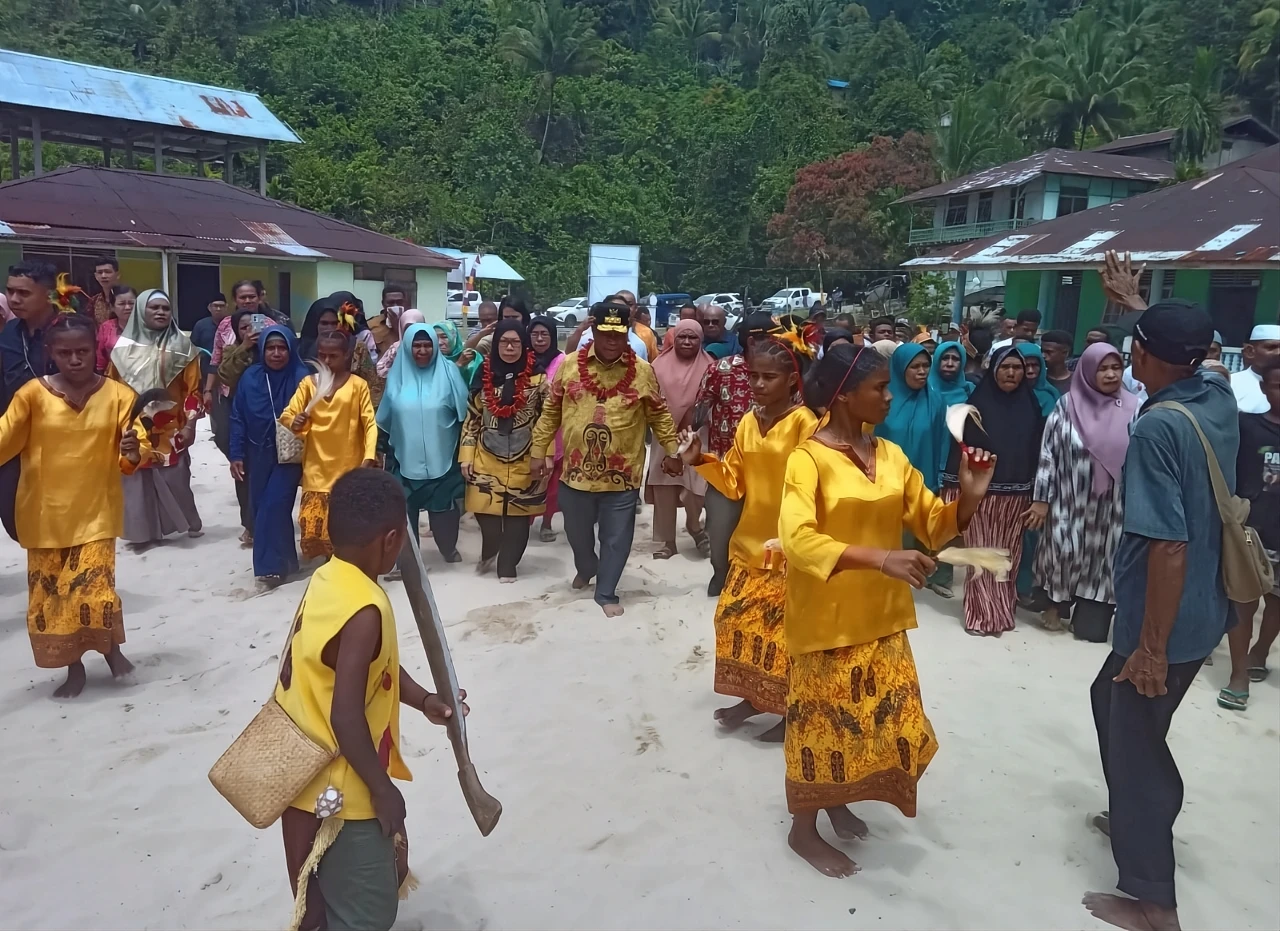
A boy holding qpod-qpod performing cakalele mbreh dance in Fakfak, West Papua

== See also ==
- Kabasaran
- Arnis
