= Sea worm =

Sea worm, also spelt seaworm, may refer to one or several of the following taxa:

Taxonomic name	Type	Description	Size (length)
Annelida	phylum	segmented worms	ranges from microscopic to 3 metres (9.8 ft)
Aplacophora	Sub-phylum	molluscs that look like worms	a few millimeters to several centimeters
Chaetognatha	phylum	arrow worms	2 to 120 millimetres (0.079 to 4.724 in)
Cycliophora	phylum	found living attached to the bodies of lobsters	less than ½ mm wide
Entoprocta	phylum	sessile aquatic worms	ranges from 0.1 to 7 millimetres (0.0039 to 0.2756 in)
Gastrotricha	phylum	pseudocoelomate worms	0.06 to 3 millimetres (0.0024 to 0.1181 in)
Gnathostomulida	phylum	jaw worms	0.5 to 1 millimetre (0.020 to 0.039 in)
Hemichordata	phylum	deuterostome worms	a few centimeters to 2,5 meters
Kinorhyncha	phylum	pseudocoelomate invertebrates, widespread in mud or sand at all depths	1 mm or less
Loricifera	phylum	sediment-dwelling worms	100 μm to ca. 1 mm
Micrognathozoa	superphylum	discovered living in homothermic springs	0.1 millimetres (0.0039 in)
Nematoda	phylum	round worms	ranges from microscopic to 5 centimetres (2.0 in), and some parasitic ones reaching over 1 metre (3.3 ft)
Nematomorpha	phylum	parasitic worms	50 to 100 centimetres (20 to 39 in)
Nemertea	phylum	invertebrate ribbon worms	most are less than 20 centimetres (7.9 in) long, one specimen has been estimated at 54 metres (177 ft)
Phoronida	phylum	horseshoe worms	2 centimetres (0.79 in), the largest are 50 centimetres (20 in)
Platyhelminthea	phylum	flatworms	
Priapulida	phylum	penis worms, general shape may recall the shape of a penis	0.2 to 39 centimetres (0.079 to 15.354 in)
Sipuncula	class	peanut worms, a group of unsegmented marine annelids	2 to 720 millimetres (0.079 to 28.346 in)
Teredinidae	family	shipworms, which are marine bivalve molluscs	several inches to five feet.
Xenoturbellida	subphylum	bilaterian worm-like species	up to 4 centimetres (1.6 in)

== See also ==
- Marine worm
