= List of Indonesian dances =

This is a list of Indonesian dances.

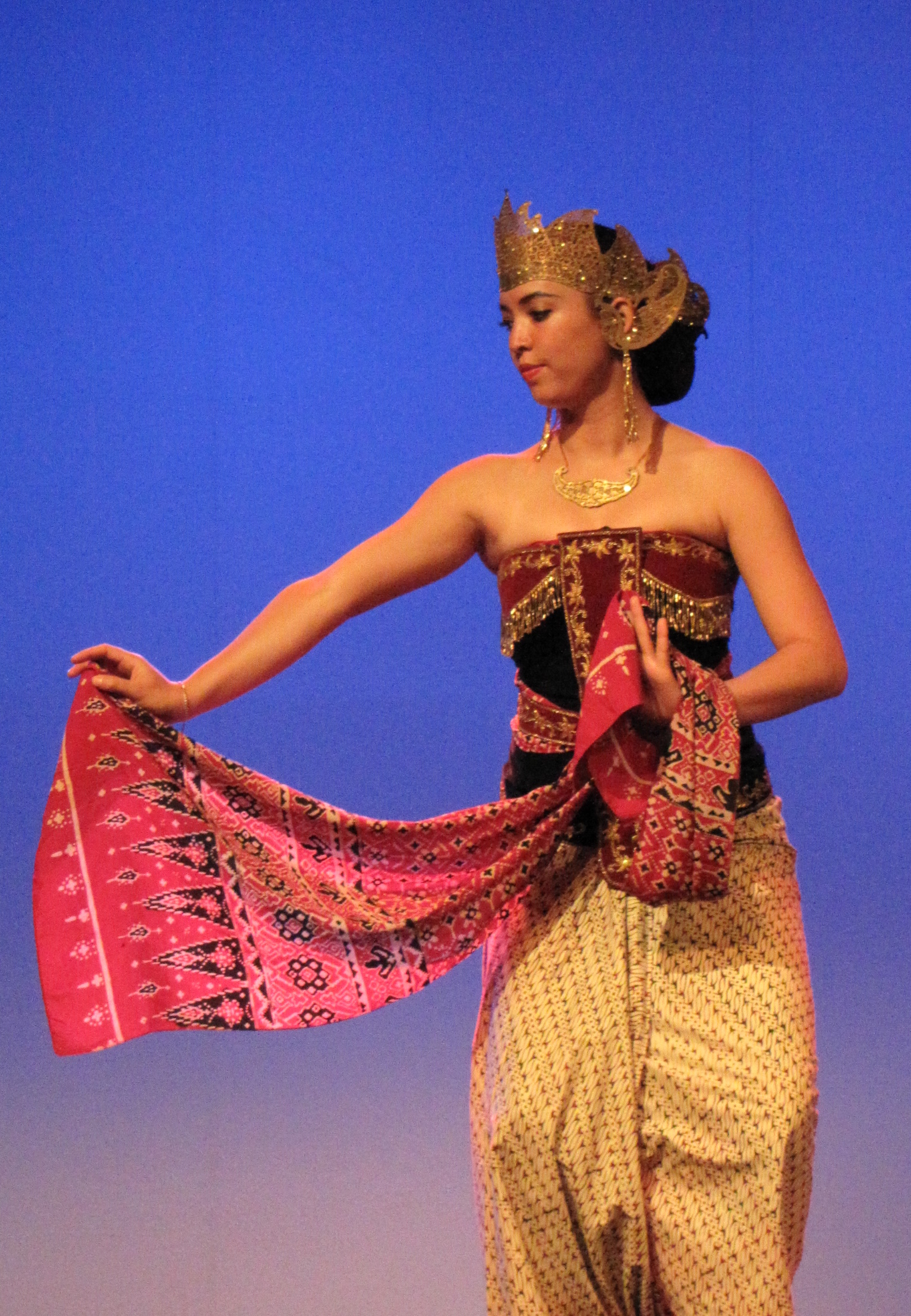
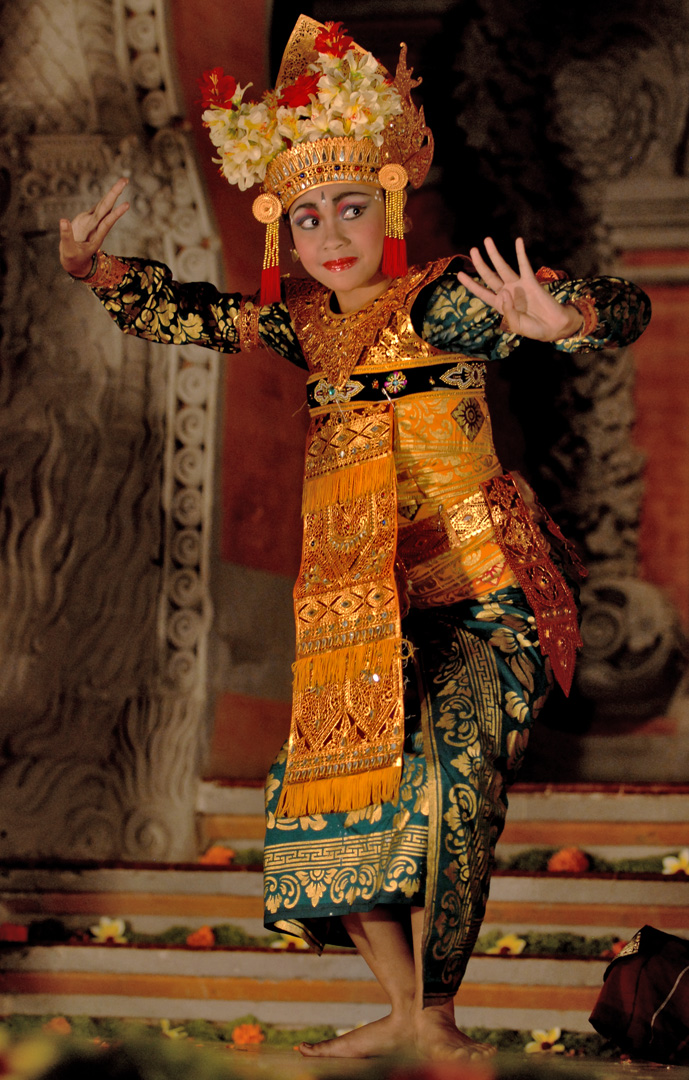
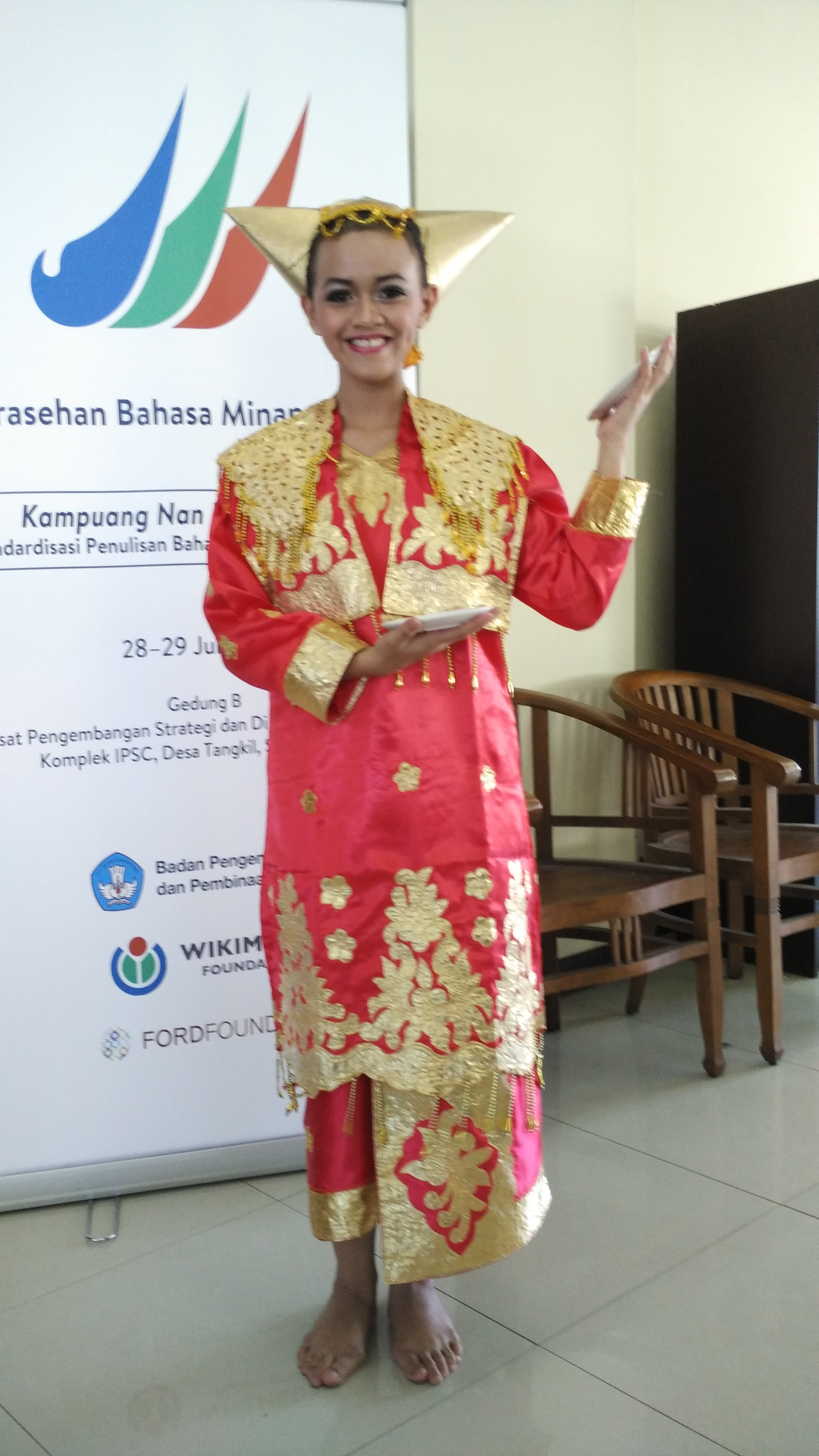
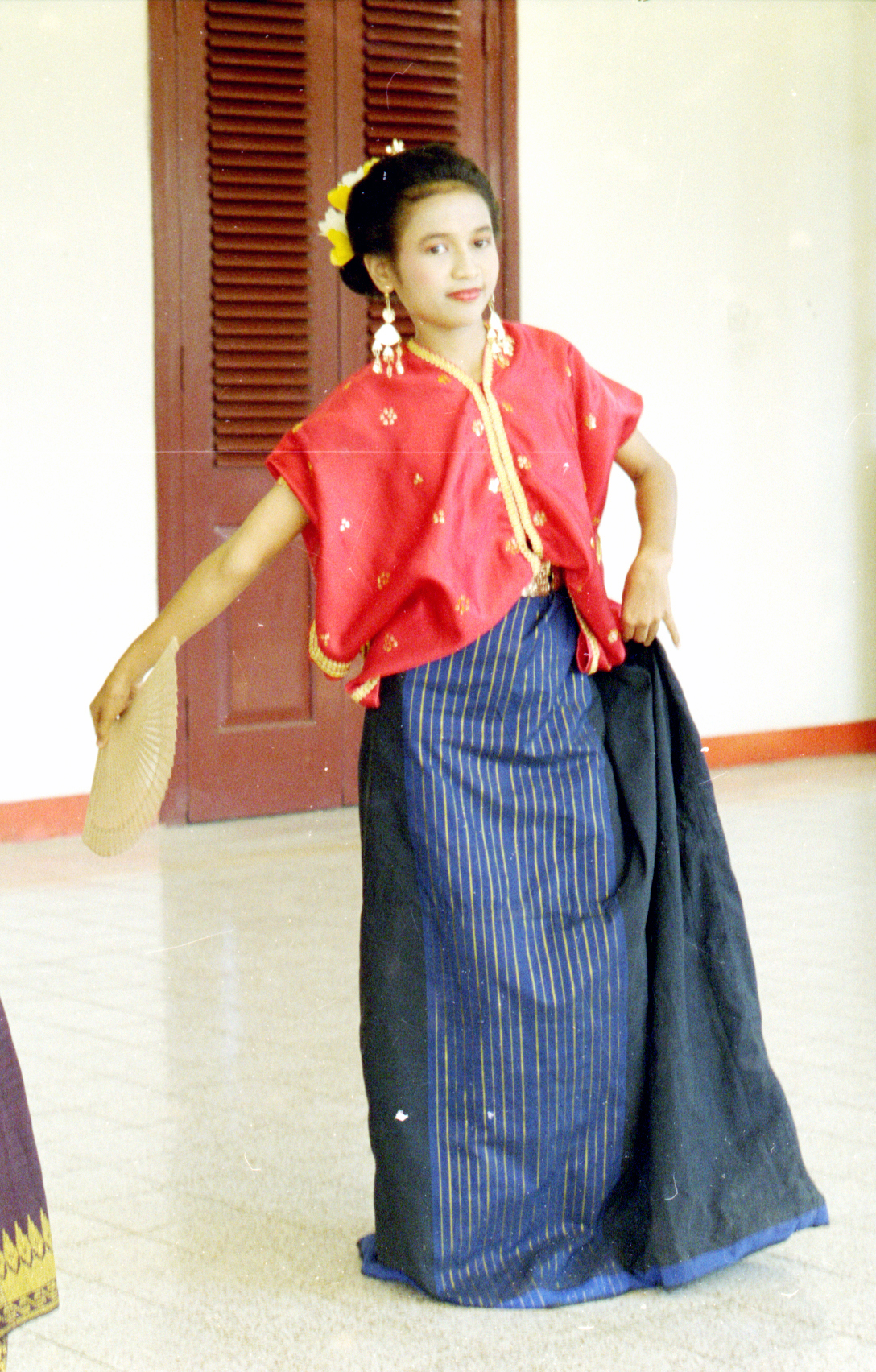
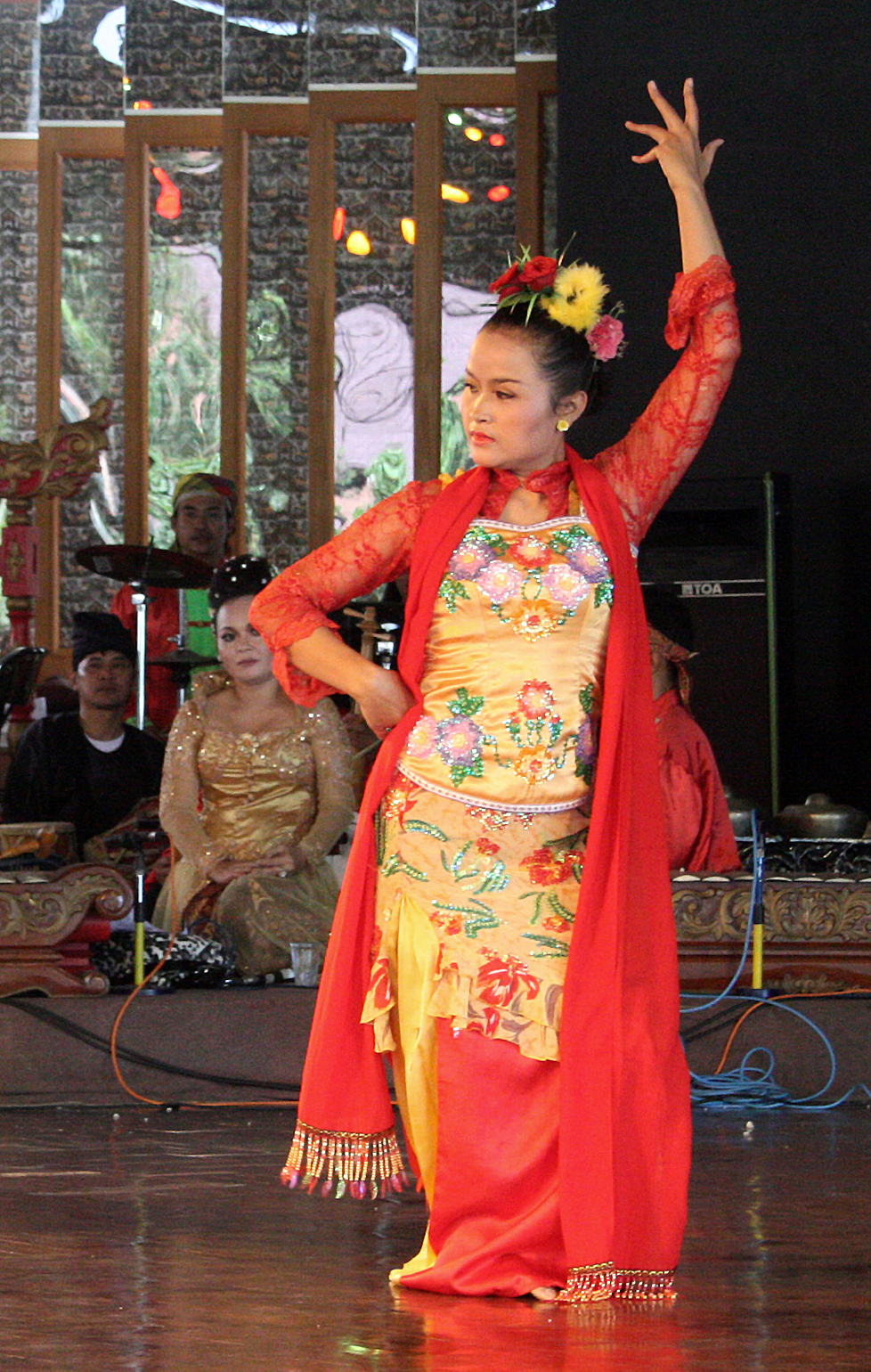
Dances in Indonesia.
From left to right: Javanese Serimpi, Balinese Legong, Minangkabau Piring, Buginese Pajoge and Sundanese Jaipongan.

== B ==
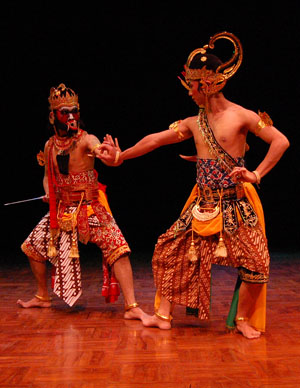
Bambangan Cakil dance

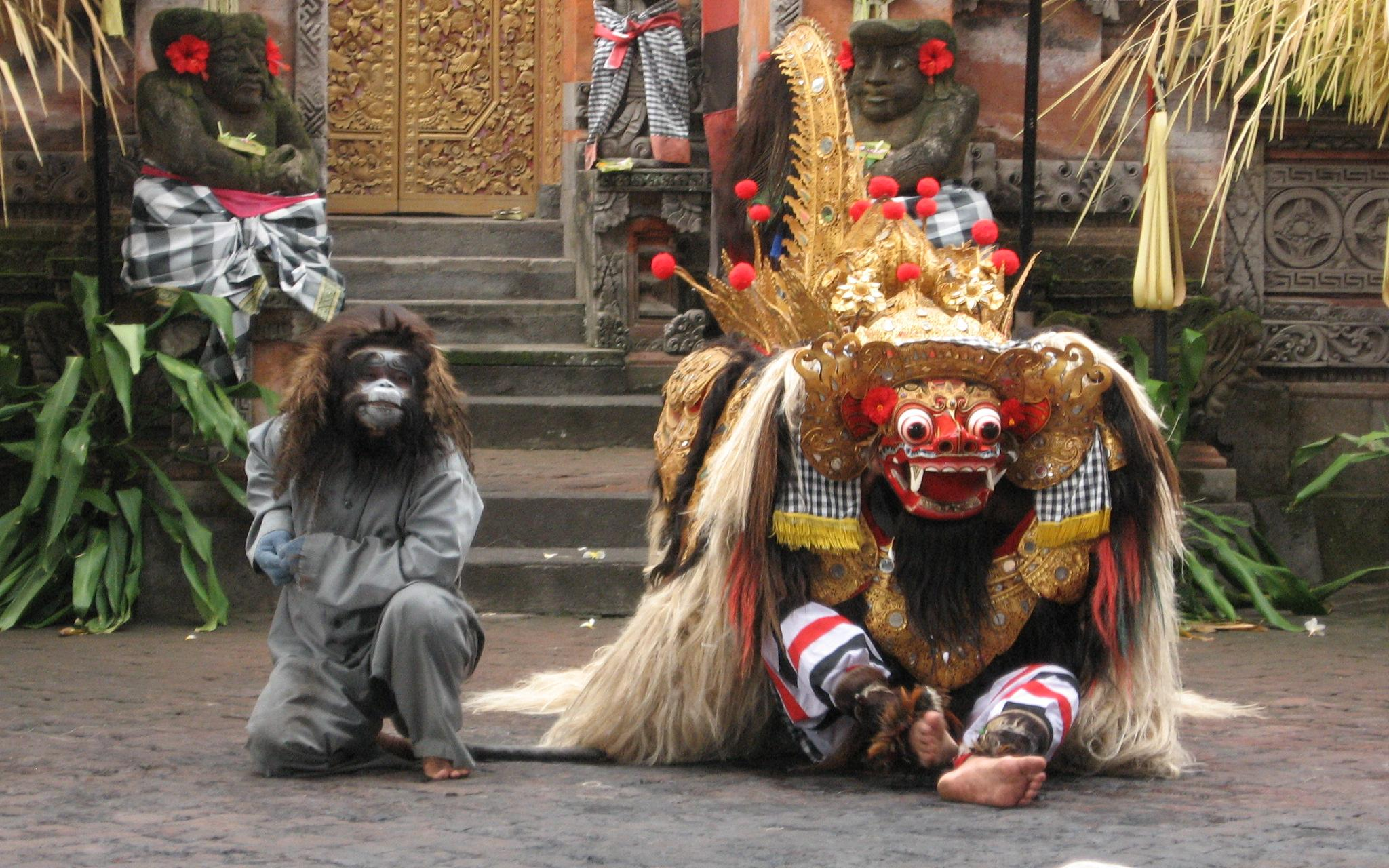
Barong dance

- Bajidor Kahot dance (West Java), a Sundanese dance which combines the dance movements of Ketuk Tilu and Jaipongan as the basic of its motions.
- Bambangan Cakil dance (Central Java), a classical dance-drama of Javanese people which demonstrates wayang kulit performance.
- Baris dance (Bali), a Balinese war dance accompanied by gamelan. Performed by one dancers or in a group.
- Barong dance (East Java and Bali), a type of Balinese and Javanese dance. The costume has panther-like shape. Popular in Java and Bali.
- Barongsai dance (nationwide), a Chinese folk dance with costume has lion-like shape, often performed by Chinese Indonesian during Chinese New Year.
- Bedhaya dance (Central Java and Yogyakarta), a Javanese sacred ritualized dance associated with the royal palaces of Yogyakarta and Surakarta, along with Srimpi.

== C ==
- Cakalele dance (Maluku), a war dance of Moluccan and aboriginal people of Sulawesi, performed by men, two of whom represent opposing captains or leaders while the others are the warriors supporting them.
- Cendrawasih dance (Bali), a Balinese dance which is performed by two female dancers, illustrates the mating rituals of the burung cendrawasih (bird of paradise)
- Condong dance (Bali), a Balinese dance which is often performed as a preface to Legong and accompanied by the gamelan semar pegulingan.

== G ==
Gandrung dance

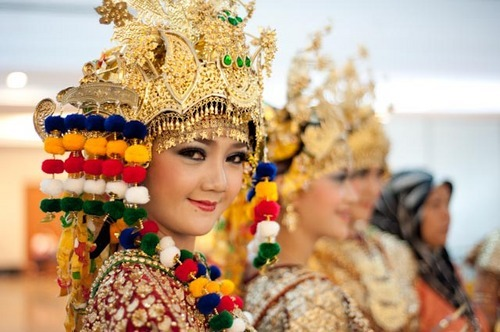
Gending Sriwijaya dance

- Gambuh dance (Bali), a Balinese dance-drama based to narrative material of the Malat, a series of poems about the folkloric Javanese prince, Raden Panji, an incarnation of Vishnu.
- Gandrung dance (East Java, Bali and West Nusa Tenggara), a ritual dance dedicated to the goddess of rice and fertility, Dewi Sri. The dance native to Javanese, Balinese and Sasak people.
- Gendang Beleq dance (West Nusa Tenggara), a sacred dance of Sasak people used big drum as main instrument known as gendang beleq.
- Gending Sriwijaya dance (South Sumatra), a Palembangese traditional dance based on the simpler Tanggai dance and believed as the reenactment and recreation of the original welcoming ceremony commonly found in traditional Malay courts in the region, which demonstrate the Sekapur Sirih.
- Golek Ayun-Ayun dance (Yogyakarta), a dance depicts a teenage girl who is growing up and likes to make up herself. This dance is very often performed to welcome guests of honor and is usually danced by two dancers, but it can also be up to six to eight dancers.

== H ==
- Hudoq dance (East Kalimantan), a masked dance performed during Erau harvest thanksgiving festival of many of sub-groups of the Dayak ethnic group.

== I ==
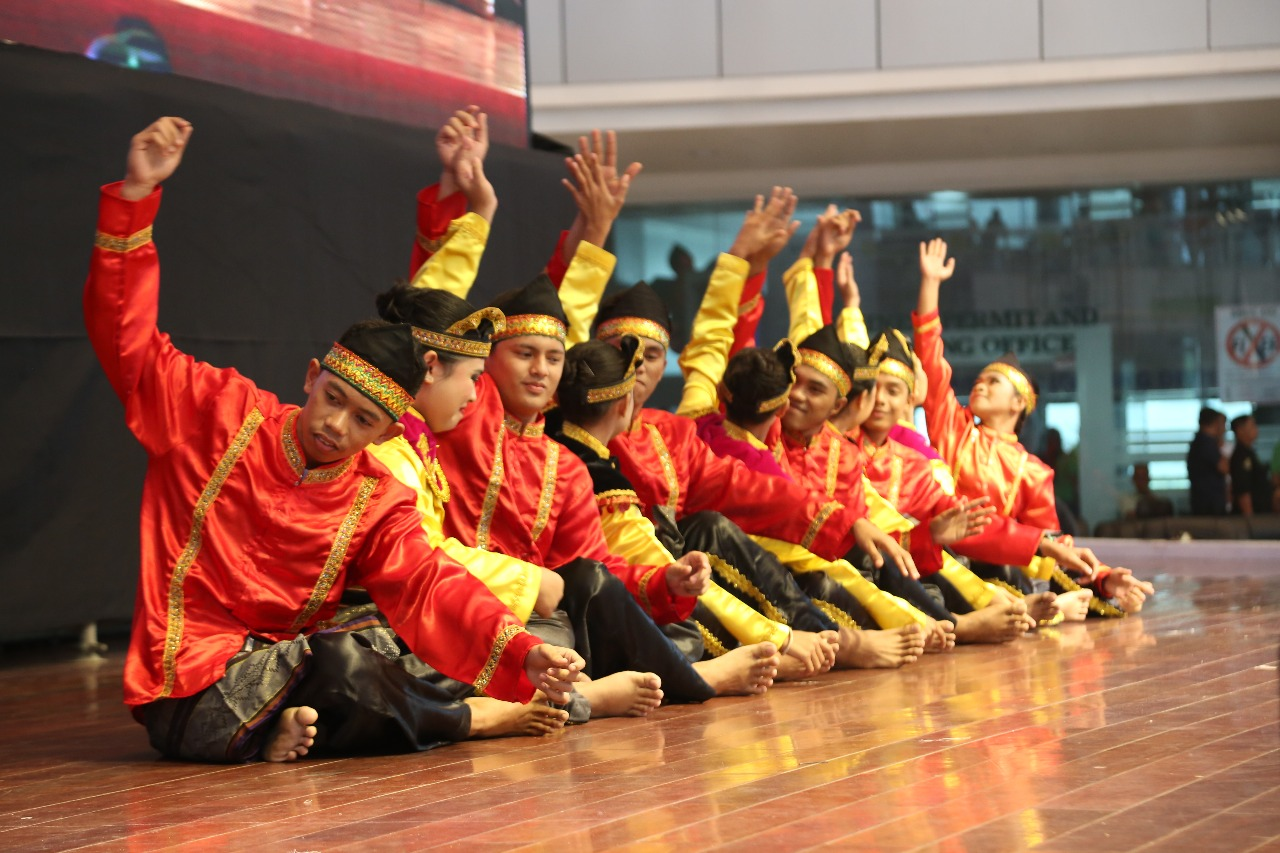
Indang dance

- Indang dance (West Sumatra), a traditional Islamic dance of Minangkabau people, develop in the usual surau that are played after the Quran recitation.

== J ==
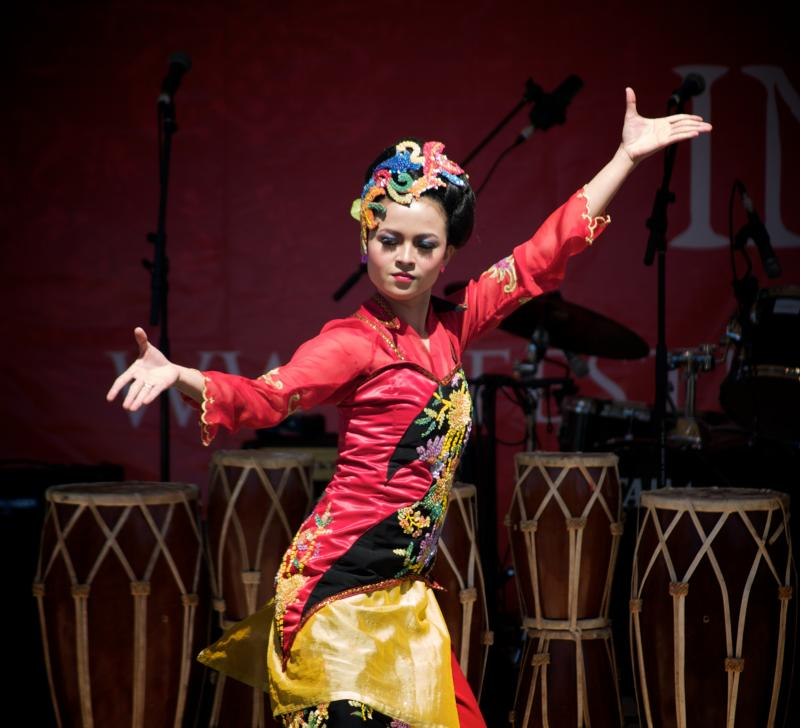
Jaipongan dance

- Ja'i, dance used in Sa'o Ngaza rites
- Jaipongan dance (West Java), a popular traditional dance of Sundanese people based on traditional Ketuk Tilu music and pencak silat movements.
- Janger dance (Bali), a flirtatious youth theatrical dance of Balinese people.
- Joged dance (Bali), a non-religious Balinese dance accompanied by the gamelan joged bumbung.
- Joget dance (North Sumatra, Riau and Riau Islands), a Malay traditional dance influenced by Portuguese culture with a rancak (dynamic) rhythm, accompanied by violin, gong, rebana and kendang.

== K ==
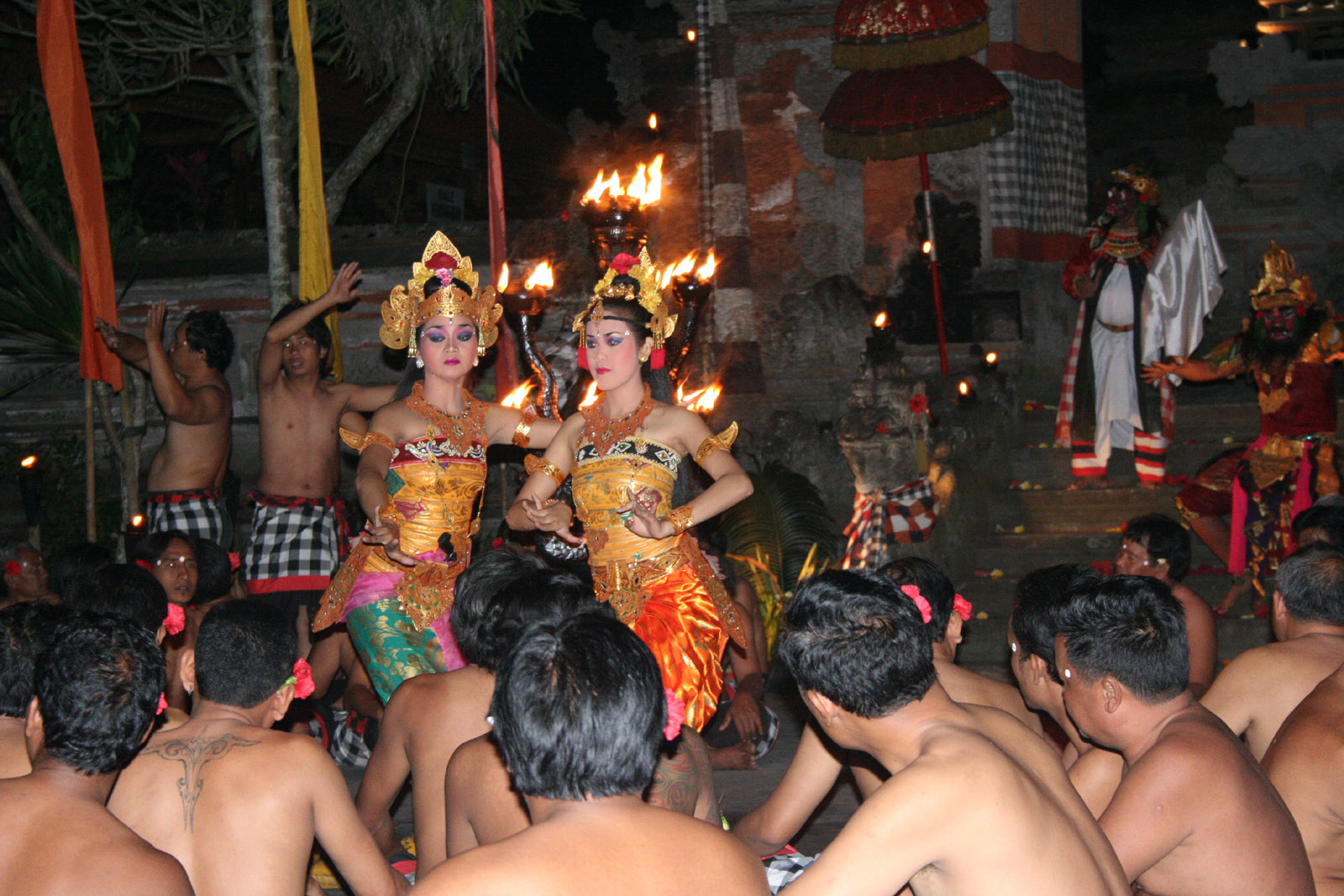
Kecak dance

- Kabasaran dance (North Sulawesi), a traditional war dance of Minahasan people, performed by several men clad in red costumes, wielding a sword or spear with a shield.
- Kancet Papatai dance (East Kalimantan), a Dayak war dance tradition based on Dayak Kenyah story.
- Kebyar Duduk dance (Bali), a Balinese dance inspired by the development of the quick-paced gamelan gong kebyar.
- Kecak dance (Bali), a form of Balinese Hindu dance-drama that performed by a circle of as many as 150 performers wearing checked cloths around their waists, percussively chanting "chak" and moving their hands and arms.
- Kuda Lumping dance (East Java), a Javanese folk dance depicting a group of horsemen. Generally, the dance portrays troops riding horses, but another type of Kuda Lumping performance also incorporates trances and magic tricks.

== L ==
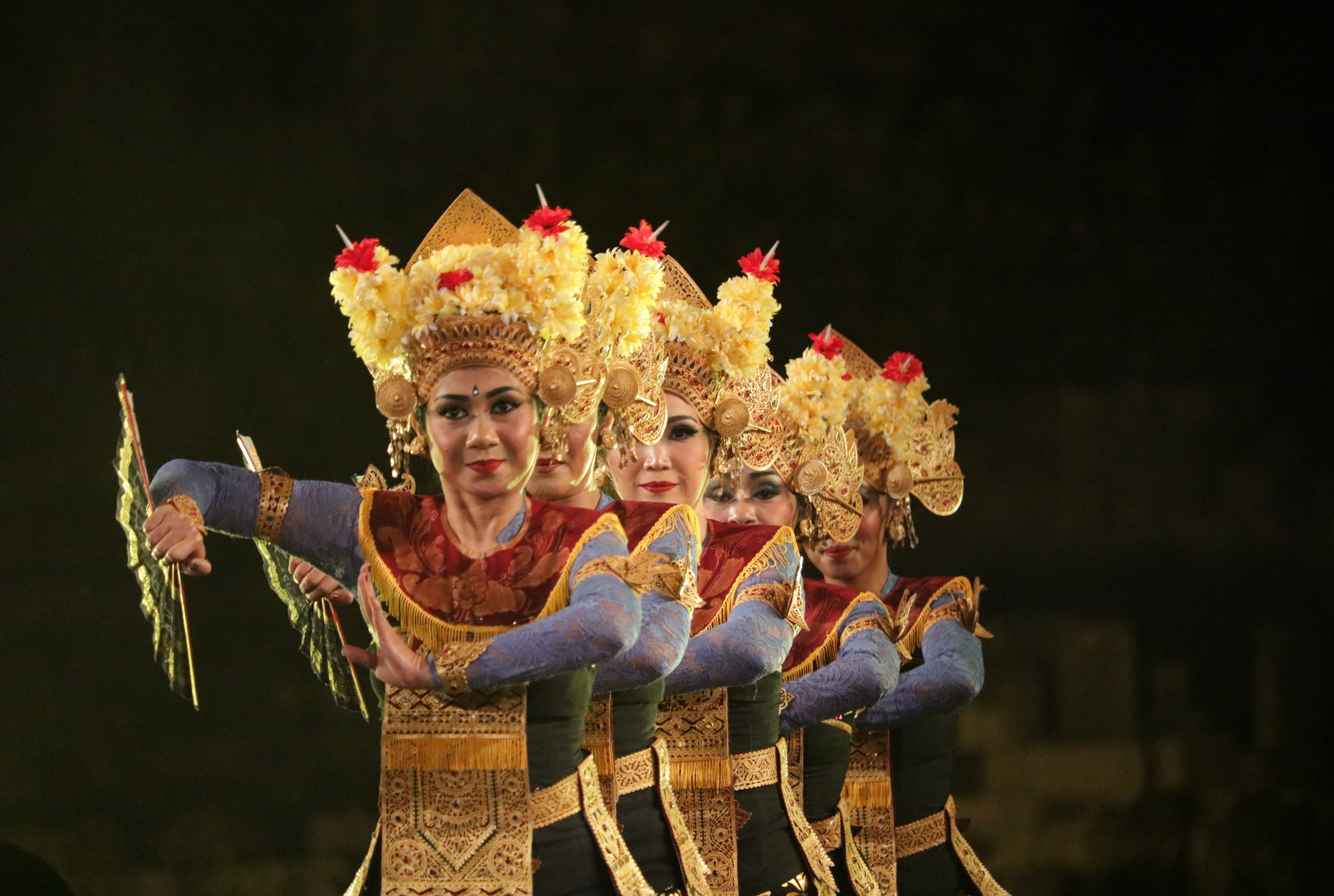
Legong dance

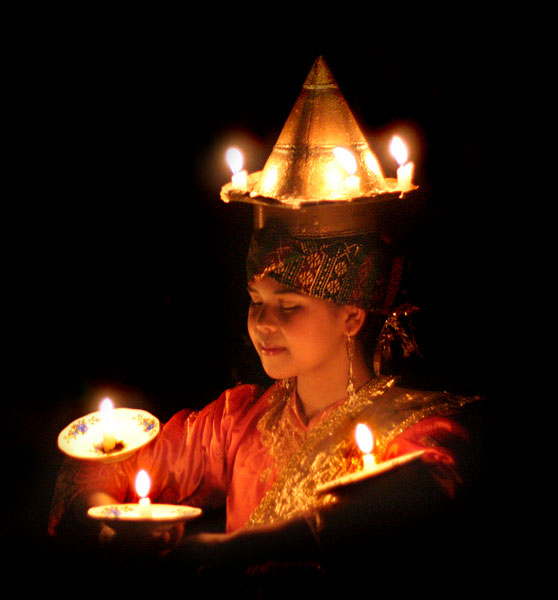
Lilin dance

- Legong dance (Bali), a Balinese dance form characterized by intricate finger movements, complicated footwork, and expressive gestures and facial expressions.
- Liang-liong dance (nationwide), a form of traditional Chinese dance figured of a dragon using poles positioned at regular intervals along the length of the dragon.
- Likok Pulo dance (Aceh), a traditional dance of Acehnese people which held after planting rice or after harvesting rice, usually the show is held at night even if the dance is contested can run all night until morning.
- Lilin dance (West Sumatra), a Minangkabau candle dance performance, the dancers carry lit candles on plates held on the palm of each hand.

== M ==
- Makyong dance (North Sumatra, Riau, Riau Islands and West Kalimantan), a traditional form of Malay dance-drama in which a form of folk theatre involving rituals connected with propitiation as well as healing
- Merak dance (West Java), a classical Sundanese dance inspired by the movements of a peacock and its feathers.

== O ==
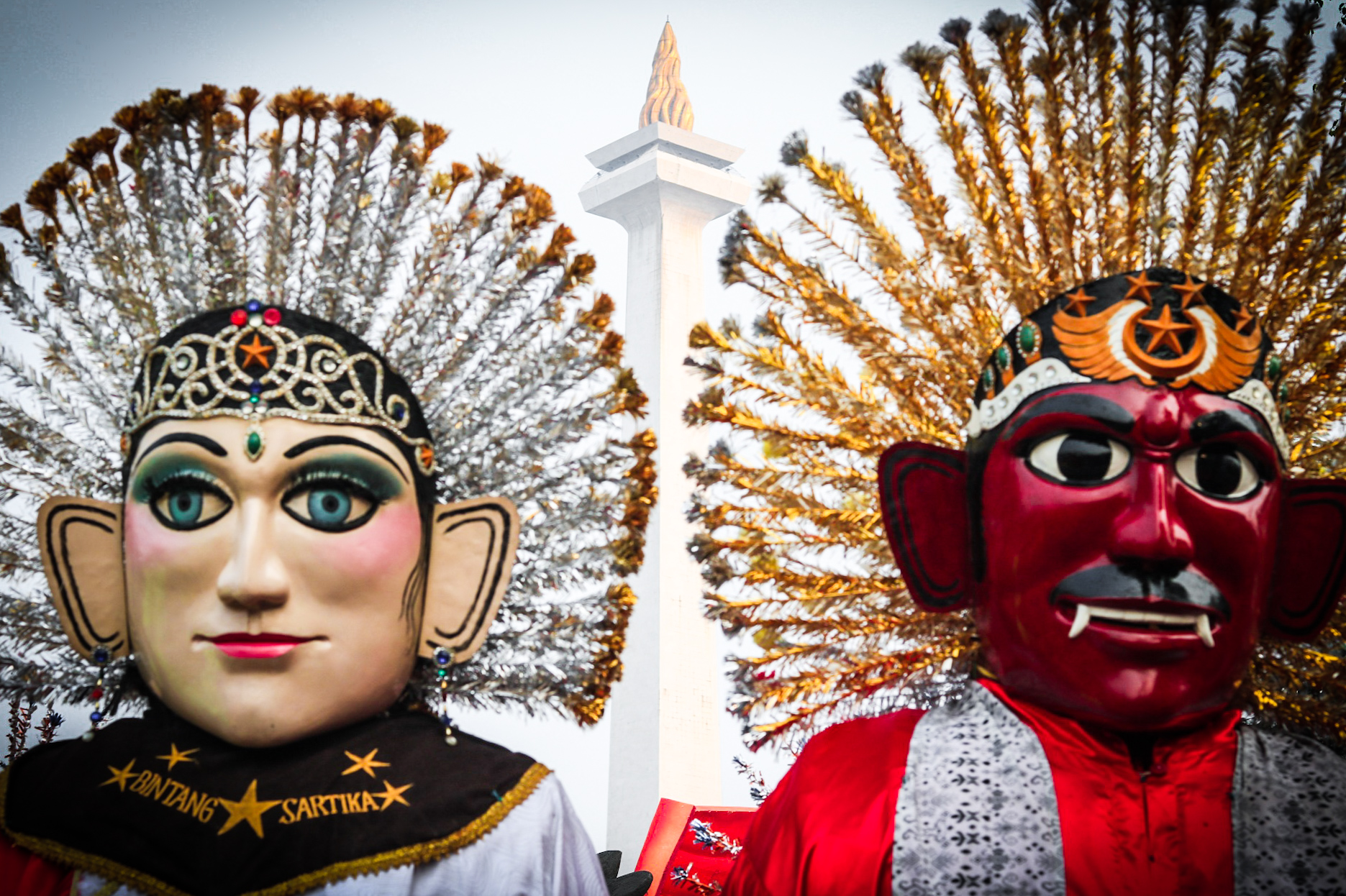
Ondel-ondel dance

- Oleg dance (Bali), a Balinese dance intended to be evocative of a garden, in which bees are buzzing about, collecting nectar from the waiting flow.
- Ondel-ondel dance (Jakarta), a folk dance performance of Betawi people using a large puppet figure known as ondel-ondel.

== P ==
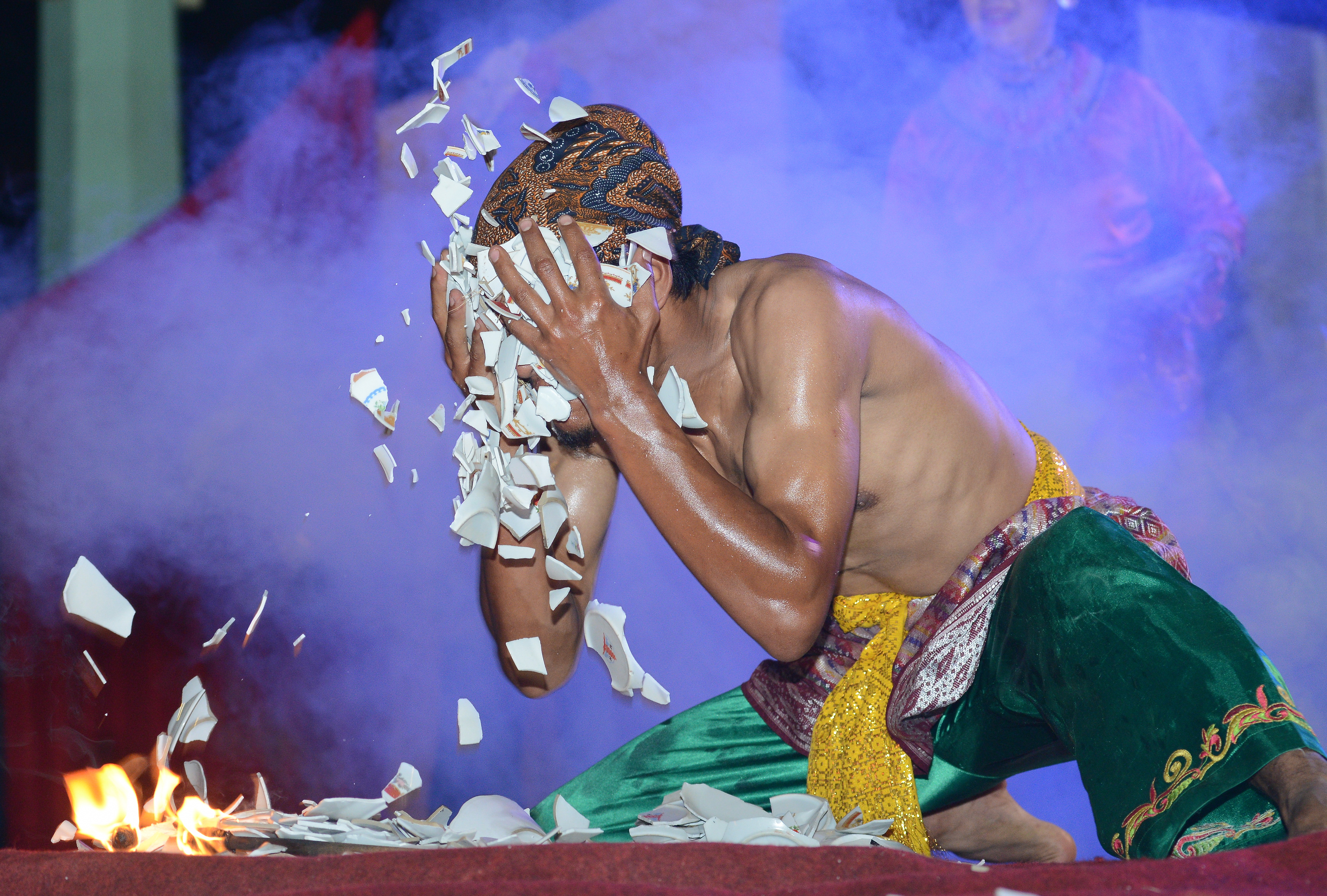
Piring dance

- Panyembrama dance (Bali), a secular Balinese dance, usually performed first, particularly before a secularised Legong performance.
- Pasambahan dance (West Sumatra), a ceremonial welcoming dance to honor the guests and elders to a traditional ceremony. This dance develop by Minangkabau people in the province.
- Payung dance (West Sumatra), a folk dance-drama tradition of Minangkabau-Malay ethnic group, using payung (umbrella) as main instrument of this dance.
- Pendet dance (Bali), a traditional dance of Balinese people in which floral offerings are made to purify the temple or theater as a prelude to ceremonies or other dances.
- Piring dance (West Sumatra), a traditional Minangkabau plate dance, demonstrates the skill of the dancers that manage balance and to move the ceramics plate swiftly without dropping or breaking the plates. Sometimes candles are lit on the plate.
- Poco-poco dance (Maluku), a popular line dance of Moluccan people of Maluku.

== R ==
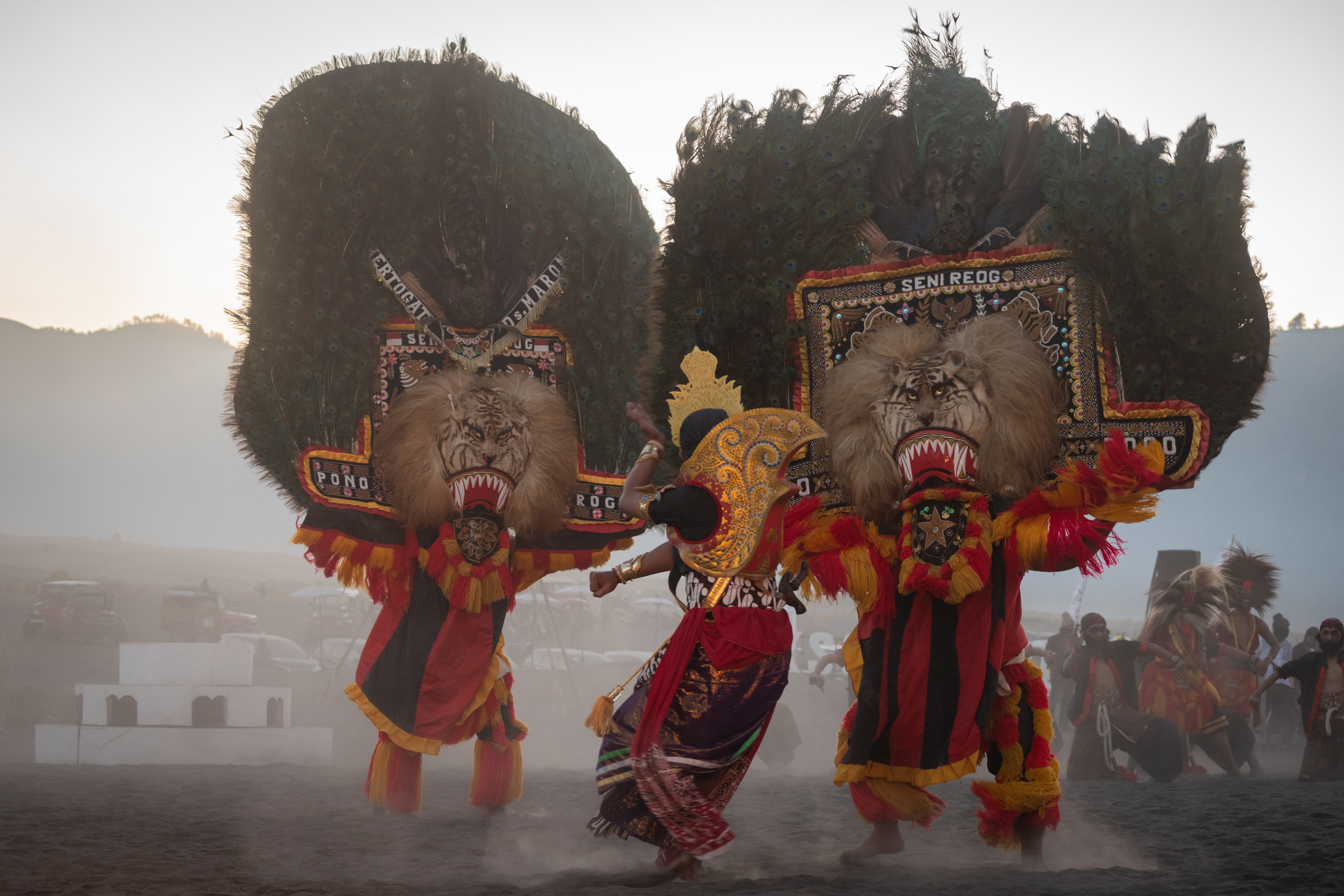
Reog dance

- Reog dance (East Java), a traditional Javanese dance, performed in an open arena that serves as folk entertainment, contains magical elements, the main dancer is a lion-headed person with a peacock feather decoration, plus several masked dancers and Kuda Lumping.
- Ronggeng dance (Jakarta, Central Java and East Java), a type of Javanese dance in which couples exchange poetic verses as they dance to the music of a rebab, violin and gong.
- Rokatenda dance (East Nusa Tenggara), a traditional Palue dance, its name is taken from Mount Rokatenda in Palue Island, the dancers wear white clothes with woven sarongs and red scarves.
- Rudat dance (West Nusa Tenggara), a traditional dance of Sasak people, demonstrates pancak silat martial art movements.

== S ==
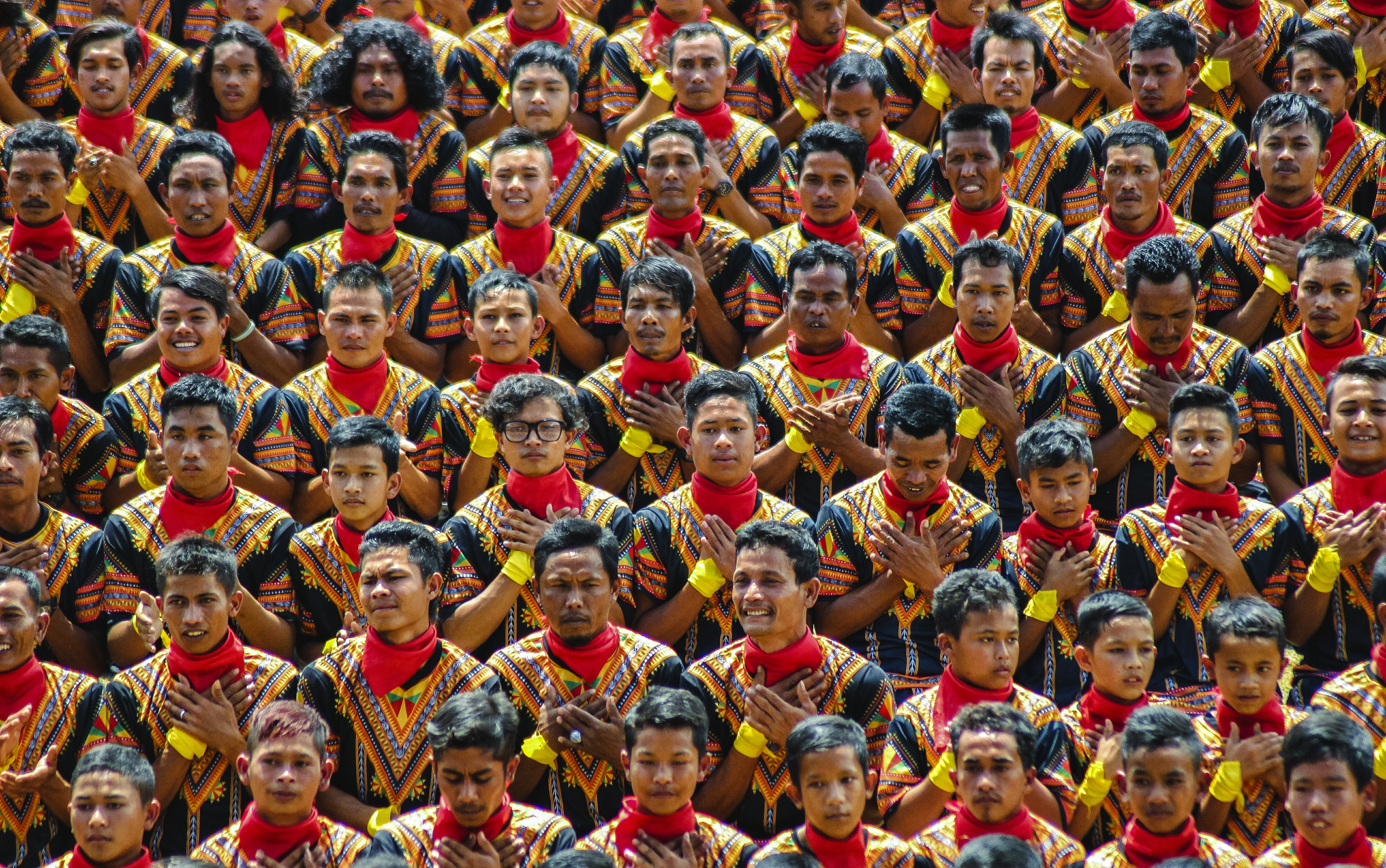
Saman dance

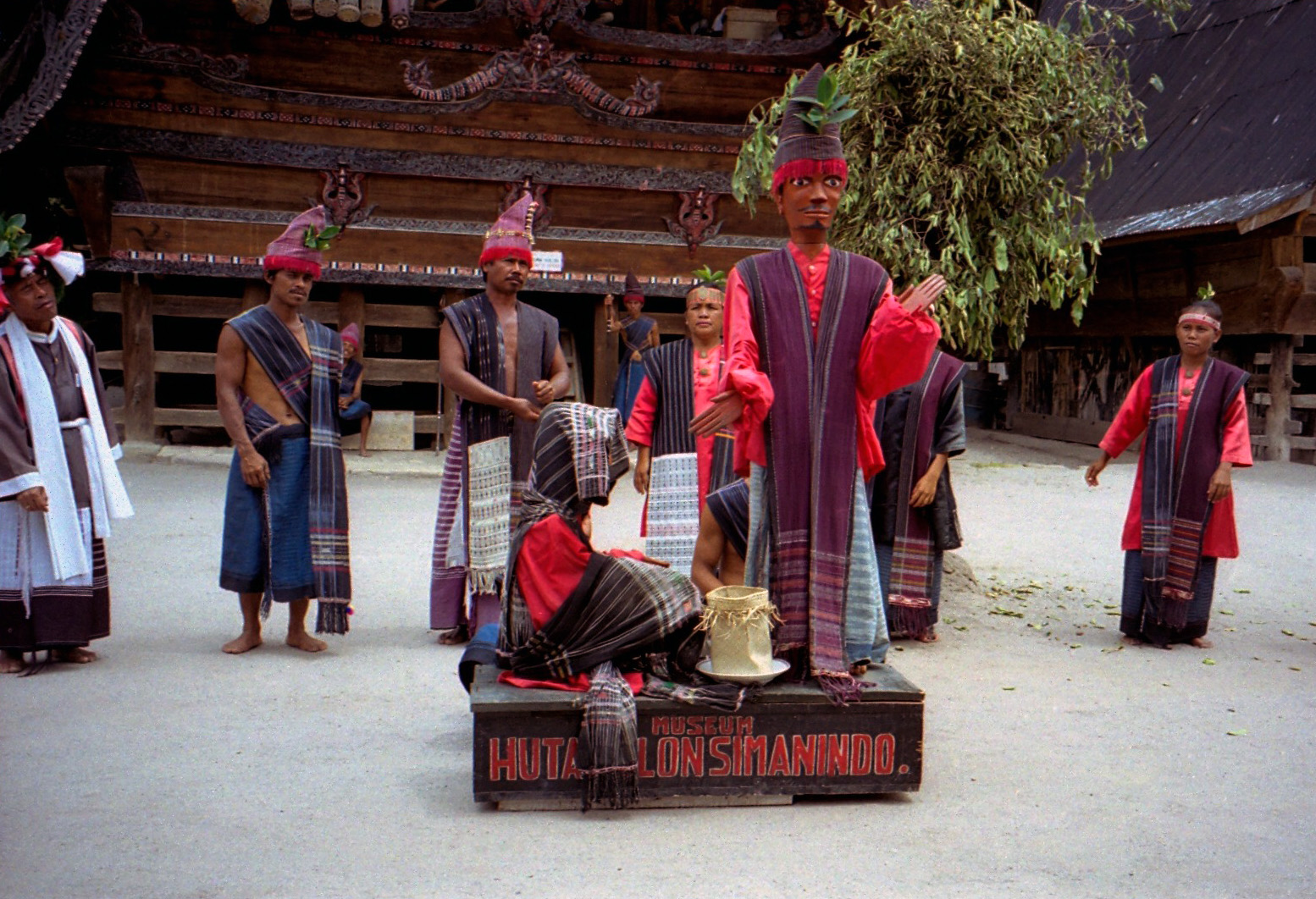
Sigale Gale dance

- Saman dance (Aceh), a popular dance of Gayo people, characterized by its fast-paced rhythm and common harmony between dancers.
- Sanghyang dance (Bali), a sacred Balinese dance based on the premise that an unseen force enters the body of an entranced performer. The force, identified as Hyang.
- Sigale Gale dance (North Sumatra), a Batak dance performance along with Sigale Gale wooden puppet.
- Singo Ulung dance (East Java), a traditional Javanese dance played by two people in a lion-like costume and accompanied by music.
- Serimpi dance (Central Java and Yogyakarta), a classical Javanese ritualized dance with slowly movement accompanied with serene gamelan.

== T ==
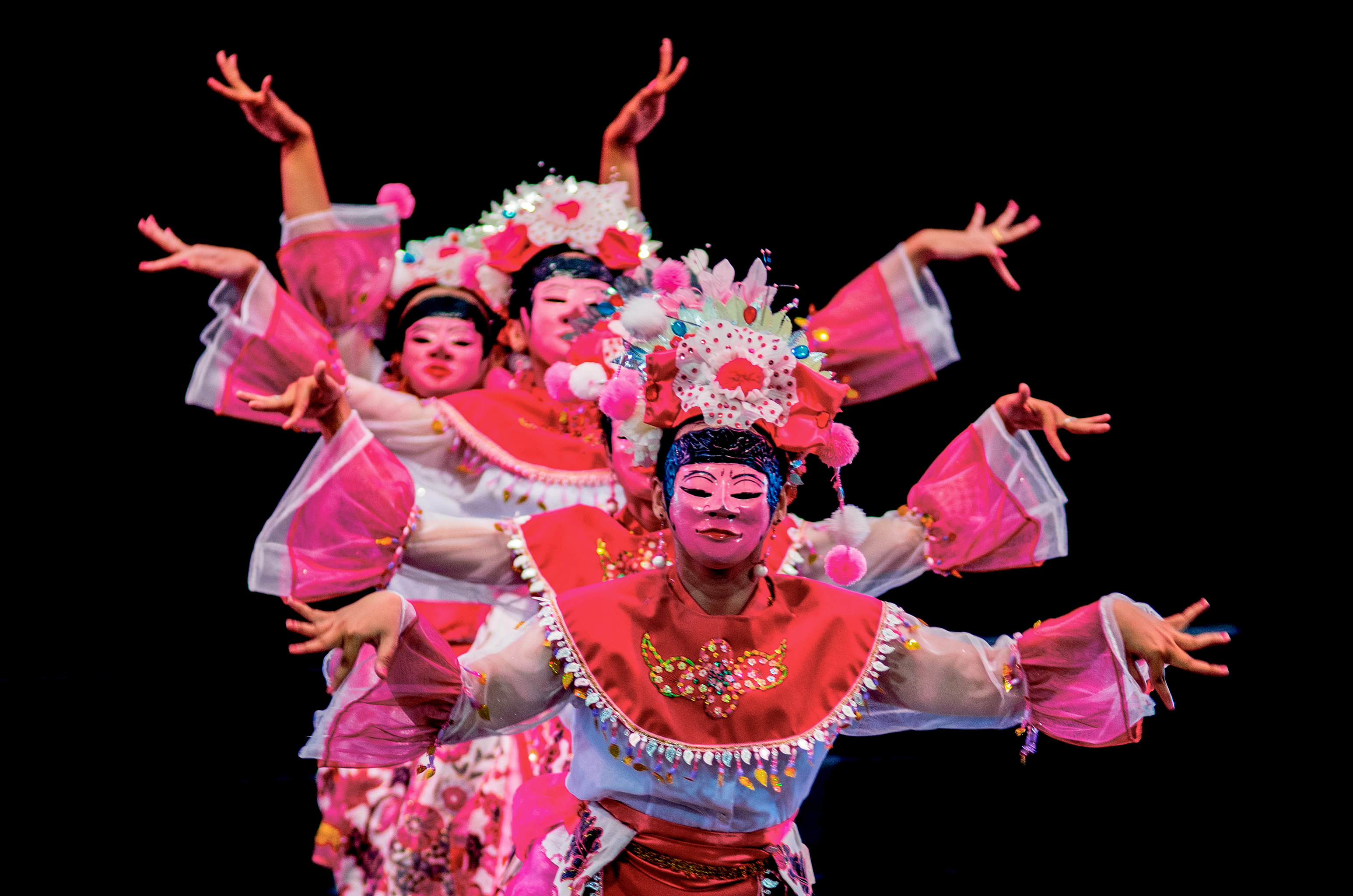
Topeng dance

- Tanggai dance (South Sumatra), a traditional welcoming dance of Palembangese people.
- Topeng dance (Banten, Jakarta, West Java, Central Java, Yogyakarta, East Java, East Kalimantan, South Kalimantan and Bali), a type of dramatic form of dance in which one or more mask-wearing, ornately costumed performers interpret traditional narratives concerning fabled kings, heroes and myths, accompanied by gamelan music. This dance practised by Balinese, Betawi and Javanese people.
  - Topeng Banjar dance (South Kalimantan), a Banjarese mask dance
  - Topeng Betawi dance (Jakarta), a Betawi theatrical form of dance-drama encompasses dance, music, bebodoran (comedy) and lakon (drama).
  - Topeng Cirebon dance (West Java and Central Java), a Cirebonese mask dance, might depict the story of Raden Panji or another Majapahit story.
  - Topeng Ireng dance (Central Java), a Javanese mask dance originating from Magelang

== U ==
- Ulek Mayang dance (Riau Islands), a classical Malay dance to appease or invoke the spirits of the sea and is always accompanied by a unique song also called Ulek Mayang. An orchestra comprising drums, gong, violin and accordion accompanies the dance.

== W ==
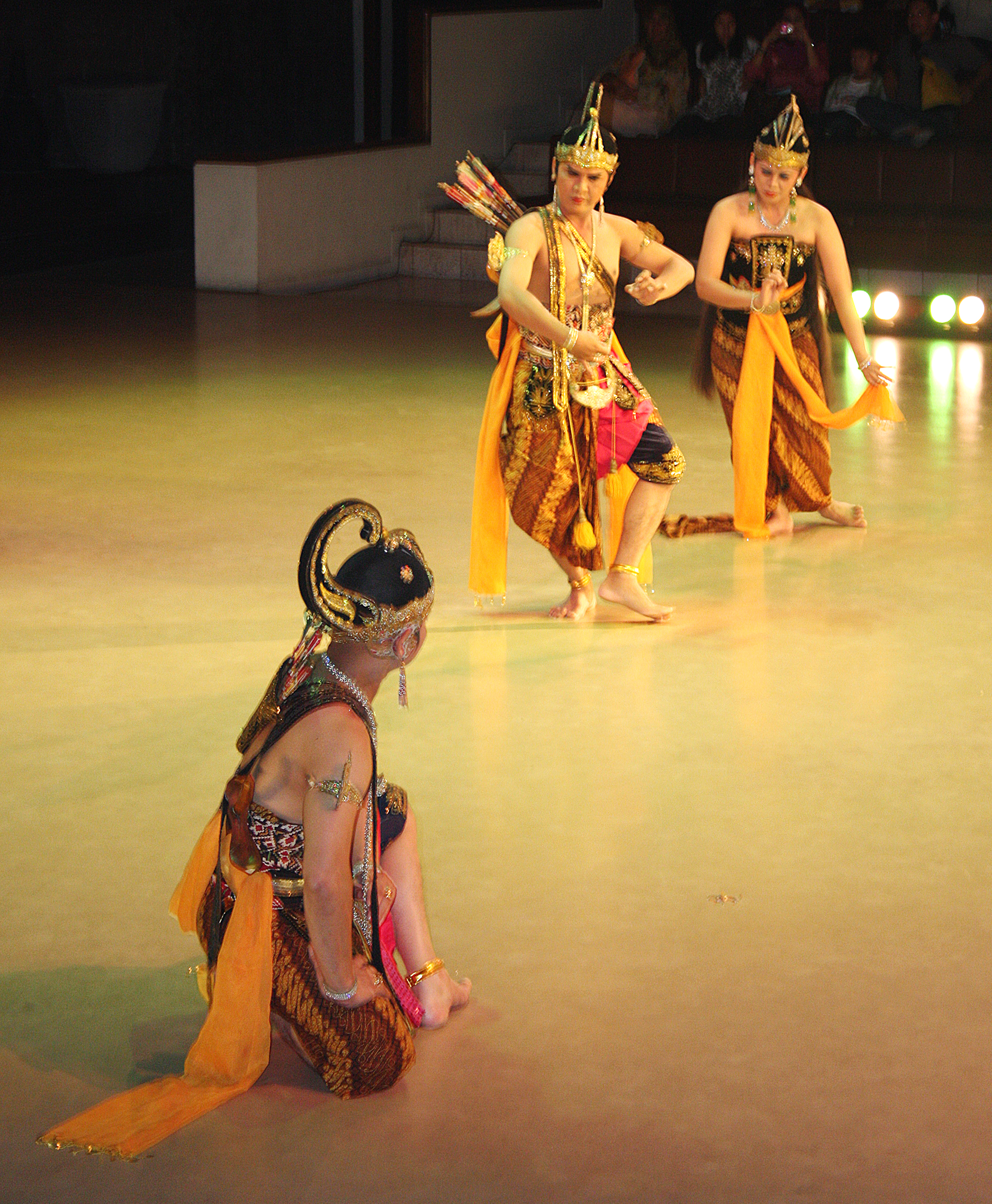
Wayang wong dance

- Wayang wong dance (Central Java, Yogyakarta, East Java and Bali), a type of classical Javanese dance theatrical performance with themes taken from episodes of the Ramayana or Mahabharata. Performances are stylised, reflecting Javanese court culture.

== Z ==
- Zapin dance (North Sumatra, Riau, Riau Islands, Jambi, Bangka Belitung Islands and West Kalimantan), a classical Malay dance of Sumatra and Kalimantan. The dancers usually perform in pairs and are accompanied by musicians playing the accordion, violin, gambus, marawis and occasionally using kompang.
  - Zapin Api dance (Riau), a type of Zapin dance in which fire dance technique.

== Other ==
- Alang dance
- Baksa Kembang dance
- Barong Ider Bumi dance
- Campak dance
- Cokek dance
- Didong dance
- Gambyong dance
- Gandrung Arum dance
- Gantar dance
- Golek dance
- Jurit ampil kridha warastra dance
- Kancet Lasan dance
- Kancet Ledo dance
- Kebagh dance
- Keurseus dance
- Kuntulan dance
- Kupu-kupu dance
- Kuyang dance
- Lenggang Betawi dance
- Lengger dance
- Lengger lanang dance
- Mabadong dance
- Maengket dance
- Mageret Pandan dance
- Manuk Rawa dance
- Mejeng Basuko dance
- Melinting dance
- Paduppa dance
- Pagar Pengantin dance
- Pajoge dance
- Pakarena dance
- Paraga dance
- Persembahan dance
- Rantak dance
- Rapai Geleng dance
- Ratoh Duek dance
- Ratoh Jaroe dance
- Remo dance
- Rodat dance
- Rodat Cempako dance
- Sajojo dance
- Seblang dance
- Sekapur Sirih dance
- Sekar Jepun dance
- Serampang Dua Belas dance
- Serumpai dance
- Seudati dance
- Sisingaan dance
- Tandak dance
- Tandok dance
- Tebe dance
- Tor-tor dance
- Wayang gedong dance
- Yapong dance

== See also ==
- Dance in Indonesia
- List of ethnic, regional, and folk dances by origin
