= Gendang Beleq (dance) =

Indonesian traditional dance

Gendang Beleq dance
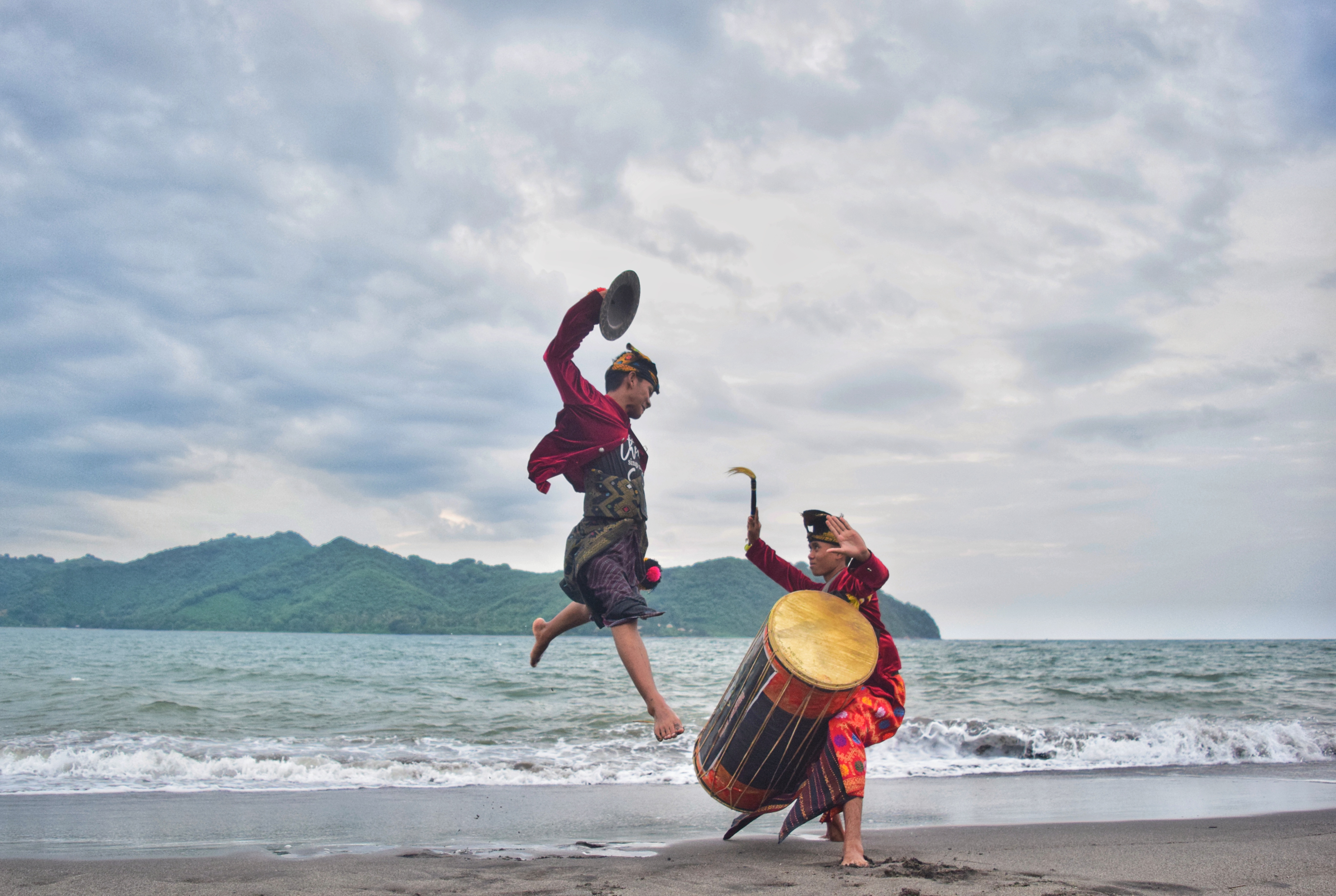
- Gendang Beleq dance performance
- Origin: Indonesia

Gendang Beleq dance is a sacred folk dance tradition of the Sasak people of Lombok, West Nusa Tenggara, Indonesia. This dance performance is usually accompanied by big drums, called gendang beleq.

Gendang beleq can be performed during life-cycle ceremonies, such as celebration of birth, circumcision, wedding and funeral. It can also be performed in a ceremony to invoke rainfall or in a celebration for national holidays.

== Terminology ==
The name of Gendang Beleq dance is a Sasak language term, which means "big drum". The performance is about a group of musicians playing, dancing, and marching with their traditional instruments, centered on two big kendang (drums) players.

== Dance ==
The Gendang Beleq dance is performed in a group form of orchestra. The orchestra consists of two gendang beleqs, that are male gendang mama and female gendang nina to carriers the dynamics. Kodeq drum, a sniper rifle and a code shooter as a rhythmic tool. While a gong and two reogs, that are reog nina and reog mama to carriers the melody. The player for the ensemble is called sekehe. It is composed of males only (usually young boys). Gendang beleq usually performed by 13 or 17 people.

Gendang Beleq dance Movement
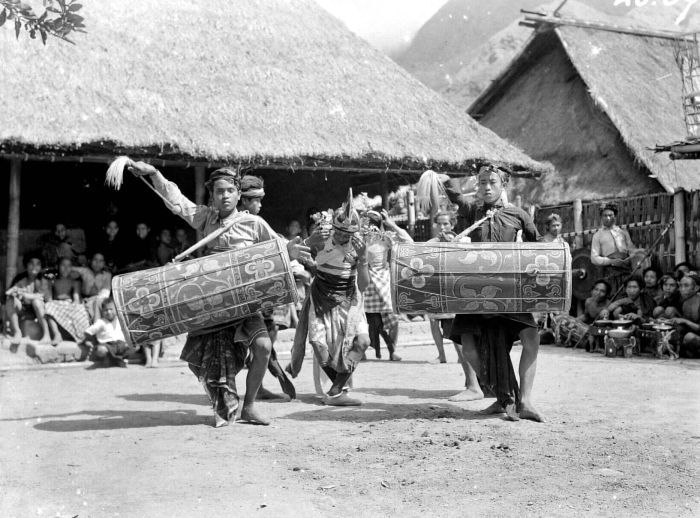
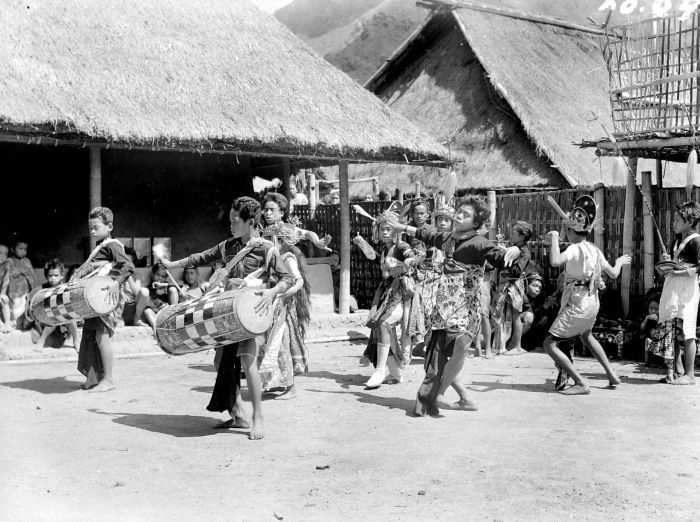
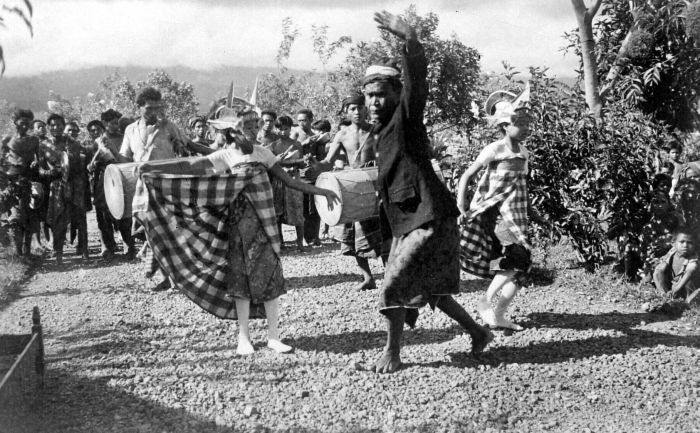

== See also ==
- Dance in Indonesia
- Rudat dance
