= Panyembrama =

Indonesian traditional

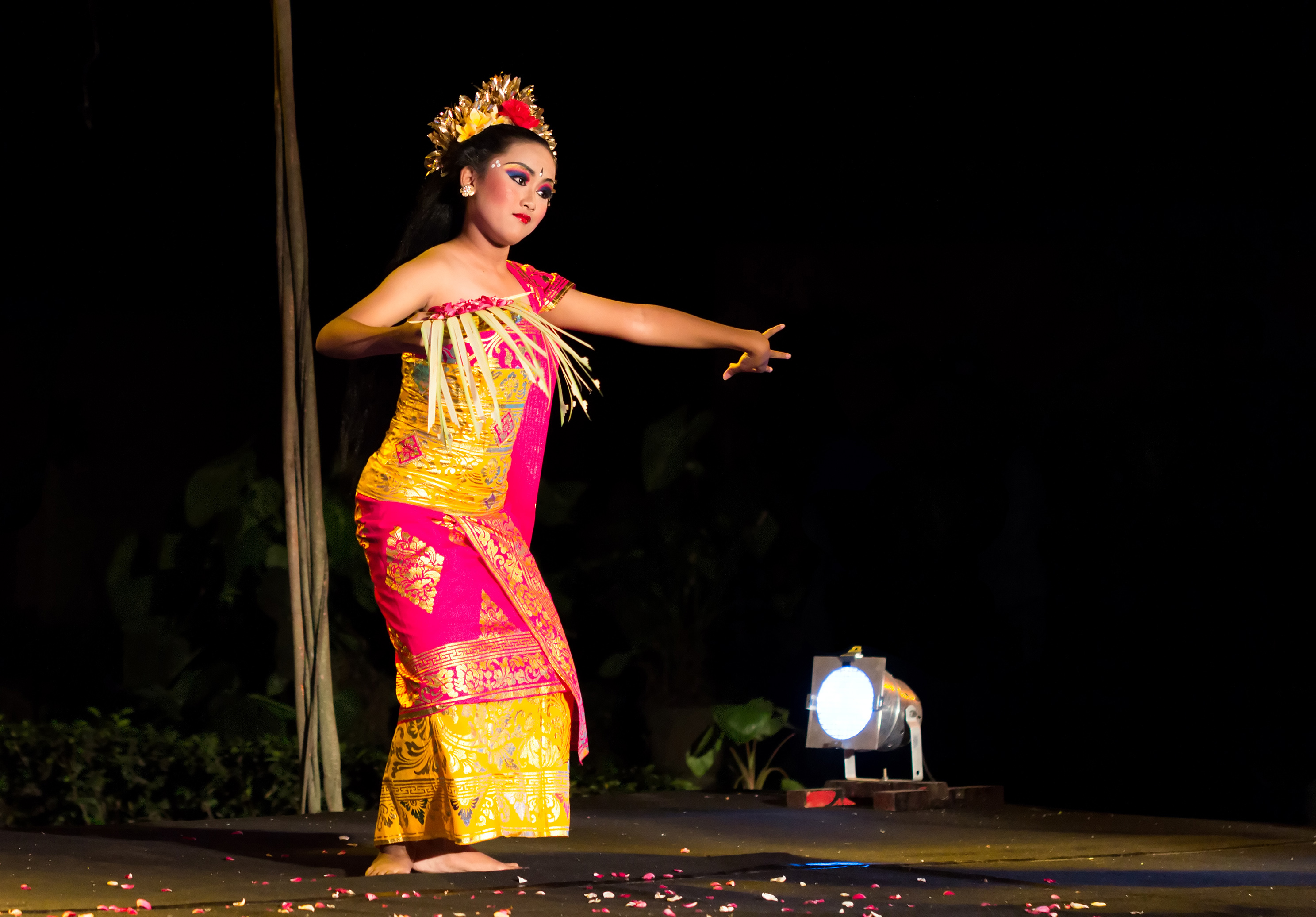
- A Balinese female Panyembrama dancer
- Native name: ᬧᬜᭂᬫ᭄ᬩ᭄ᬭᬫ (Balinese); Tari Panyembrama (Indonesian)
- Instrument(s): Gamelan
- Inventor: Balinese (I Wayan Berata)
- Origin: Indonesia

Panyembrama (Balinese: ᬧᬜᭂᬫ᭄ᬩ᭄ᬭᬫ) is a secular Balinese dance form designed by I Wayan Berata and first performed in 1971. It includes movements from several sacral Balinese dances. The dance was intended to replace for performances in front of tourists.

== History ==
Traditional Balinese dances are sacral in nature, thus unsuited for secular performances. That these dances were used for welcoming non-Balinese, and in non-sacral contexts, was a point of controversy in the late 1960s. A secular dance was needed, one which could be used outside of the temples, particularly for tourists, and thus maintain the sacredness of the original dances. Panyembrama was one of several dance forms, including oleg tamulilingan, which arose from this situation and was intended for non-Balinese (particularly Western) audiences.

I Wayan Beratha, a choreographer with the Karawitan Conservatory (Indonesian: Konservatori Karawitan) who was well-versed in traditional Balinese dance, was tasked by his organisation to create a new, secular dance. To create what would become panyembrama, Beratha combined the most beautiful moves of traditional dances such as legong, condong, and pendet. Ethnomusicologist Zachar Laskewicz writes that the continued inspiration of these dances allows similar texts to be interpreted from the panyembrama performance. This basis in traditional dance has also led to panyembrama being classified as a form of classical dance by the art critic A. M. Hermin Kusmayati.

Panyembrama was first performed in 1971, at the Pandan Festival. This dance form has been taught at Balinese dance schools, and been used at temples in religious ceremonies, as a sort of welcoming dance for the gods.

== Performance ==
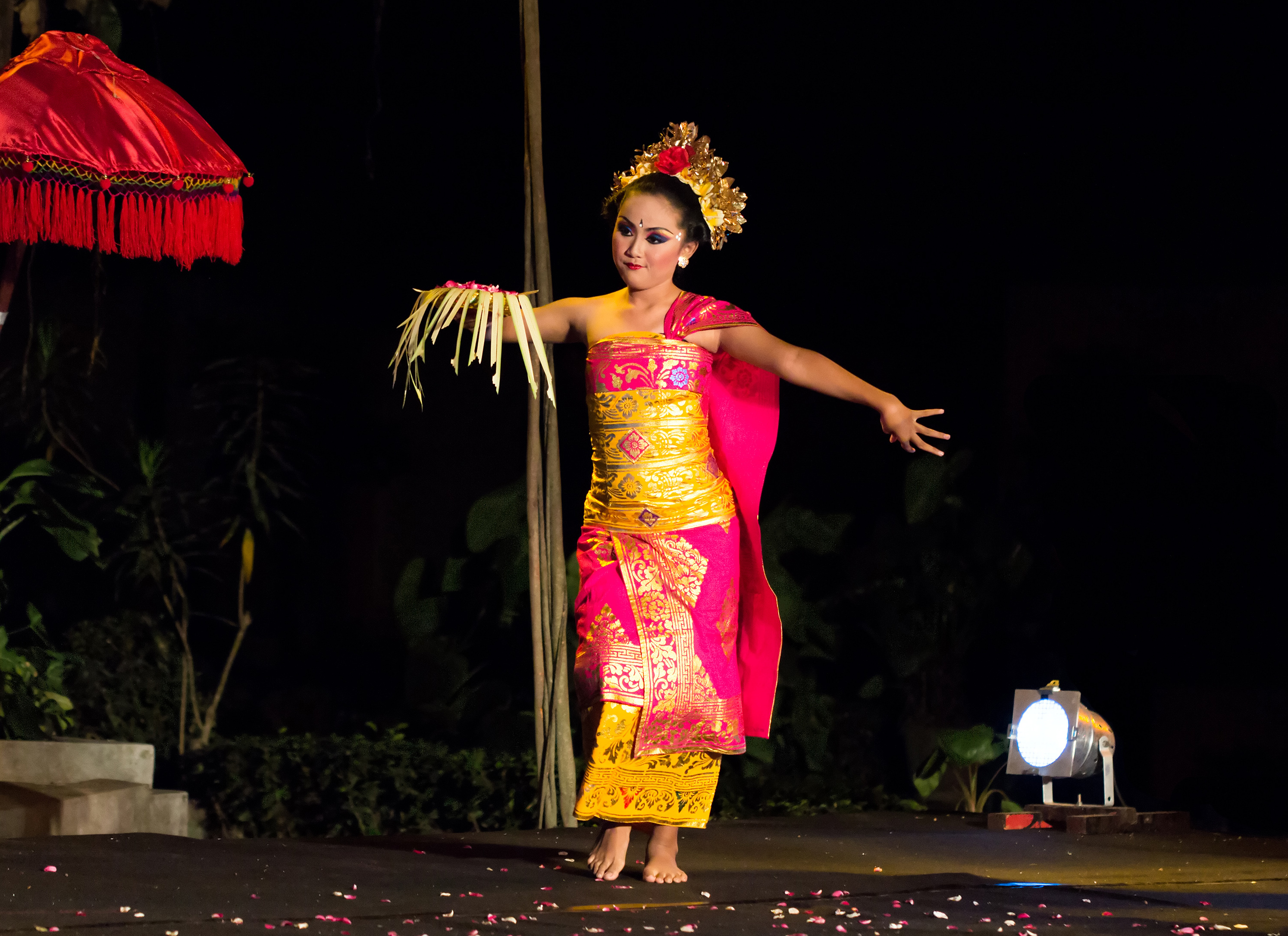
A panyembrama dancer with her flower dish

The name panyembrama, from the Balinese word sambrama, means "welcome". This is reflective of its purpose as a welcoming dance. In lengthy events, the dance is usually performed first, particularly before a secularised legong dance.

The dancers – always young women – come onstage carrying a metal (usually silver or aluminium) dish with incense and flowers in it. These dancers, numbering two or more, wear layered clothing, decorated with a golden pattern called prada. Around their bodies they wear a kamben (sarong), as well a tightly wrapped cloth which covers from their chest to their waist. On their heads they wear golden headdresses and frangipani flowers.

To open the panyembrama dance, the performers kneel, as if praying. They make welcoming movements to the guests, accompanied by gamelan. Their movements are slow, accentuating the curves of the dancers' bodies. At the end of the performance, the dancers move in circles, throwing flowers at each other and the audience, with the scents being carried in the air. Unlike some other Balinese dances, panyembrama is not intended to convey a story.

== See also ==
- Bedhaya
- Legong
- Pendet
- Balinese dance

== Works cited ==
- Barker, Tanuja; Putra, Darma; Wiranatha, Agung (2006). "Authenticity and Commodification of Balinese Dance Performances Tanuja Barker, Darma Putra & Agung. Wiranatha". In Mike Robinson; Melanie K Smith (eds.). Cultural Tourism in a Changing World. Tourism and cultural change. Vol. 7. New York: Channel View Publications. pp. 215–24. ISBN 978-1-84541-044-5.
- Laskewicz, Zachar (2003a). "From the Hideous to the Sublime: Olfactory Processes, Performance Texts, and the Sensory Episteme". Performance Research. 31 (8): 55–65. ISSN 1469-9990.
- Laskewicz, Zachar (2003b). Music as Episteme, Text, Sign and Tool: Comparative Approaches to Musicality as Performance. Seattle: Saru. ISBN 978-0-935086-35-5.
- Heimarck, Brita Renee (2003). Balinese Discourses on Music and Modernization: Village Voices and Urban Views. Current research in ethnomusicology. Vol. 5. New York: Routledge. ISBN 978-0-415-94208-9.
- Kusmayati, A.M. Hermin (1992). "Tari Daerah" [Regional Dance]. In Soedarsono (ed.). Pengantar Apresiasi Seni [Introduction to Art Appreciation] (in Indonesian). Jakarta: Balai Pustaka. OCLC 29591251.
- Picard, Michel (2006). Bali: Pariwisata Budaya dan Budaya Pariwisata [Bali: Culture Tourism and Tourism Culture]. Jakarta: Kepustakaan Populer Gramedia. ISBN 978-979-9100-58-0.
- Suardana, Kartika D (2012). Dances of Bali. Kuta: Now! Bali. ISBN 978-602-97971-1-4.
- Tanjung, Intan (7 October 2012). "Stories within dances". The Jakarta Post. Archived from the original on 9 November 2014.
