= Raka Rasmi =

Balinese dancer (1939–2018)

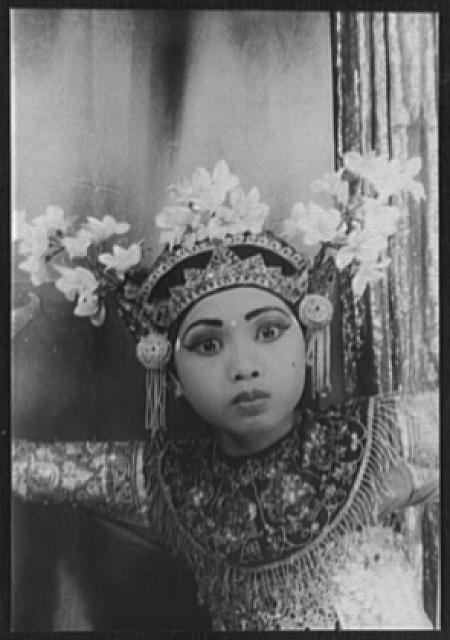
Raka Rasmi (1952)

Ni Gusti Ayu Raka Rasmi (March 10, 1939 – April 17, 2018), also known as Raka Rasmi, was a Balinese dancer who introduced the stylized art of Balinese dance to the world. She was the youngest member of the Balinese dance troupe, the Bali Dancers, that was the first to perform in the United States in 1952.

Rasmi began her career in 1951 as part of the Sekaha Gong Peliatan. She was then discovered by John Coast, former English Diplomat, who formed the Balinese dance group.

Rasmi became the first to dance the Oleg Tamulilingan, or the Bumblebee, a then controversial dance in which male and female dancers circle each other.

In 2005 she was part of an award-winning festival performance that brought together veteran local dancers with emerging artists.
