= Ja'i =

Ja'i is an Indonesian dance used in Sa'o Ngaza rites to express gratitude and excitement. The dance is usually displayed in the middle of the village; site as a sacred place of worship. Ja'i dance has the characteristics and uses little space in the form of rows and performed repeatedly. As a communal dance, the beauty and allure of Ja'i lies in uniformity, and the energy of the dancers.

== Music instrument ==
Music instruments that used to accompany the Ja'i dance is five gong and three tambur.

== See also ==
- Sigale gale
