= Gendang beleq =

Indonesian traditional musical instrument

Gendang Beleq
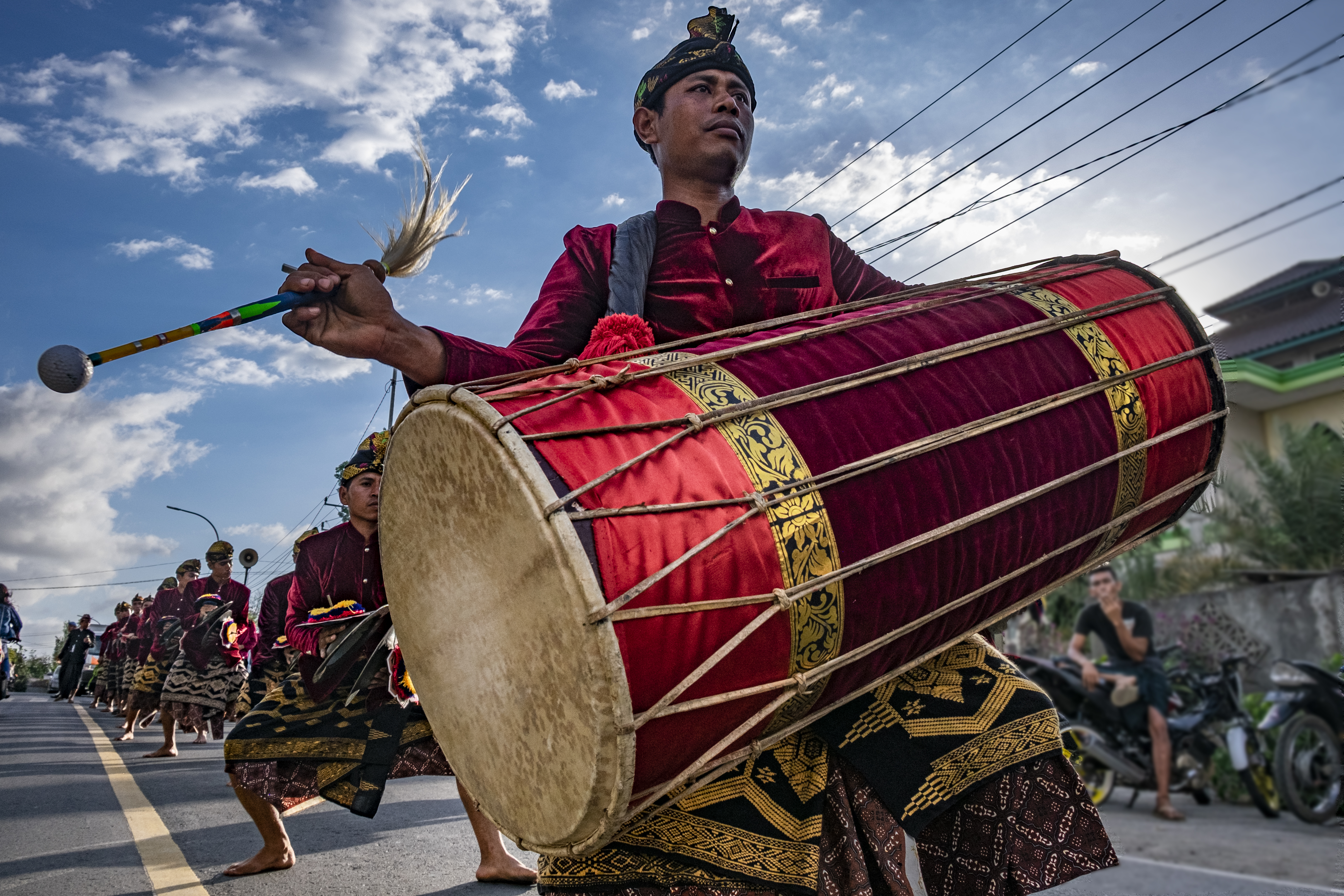
- Gendang beleq performance in road.
- Developed: Indonesia

Gendang beleq is a dance and music performance from Lombok island, Indonesia. It is a popular performance among the native Sasak people.

The name gendang beleq is a Sasak language term, which means "big drum (big gendang)", as the performance is about a group of musicians playing, dancing and marching with their traditional instruments, centered on two big drum (gendang) players.

== Instruments ==
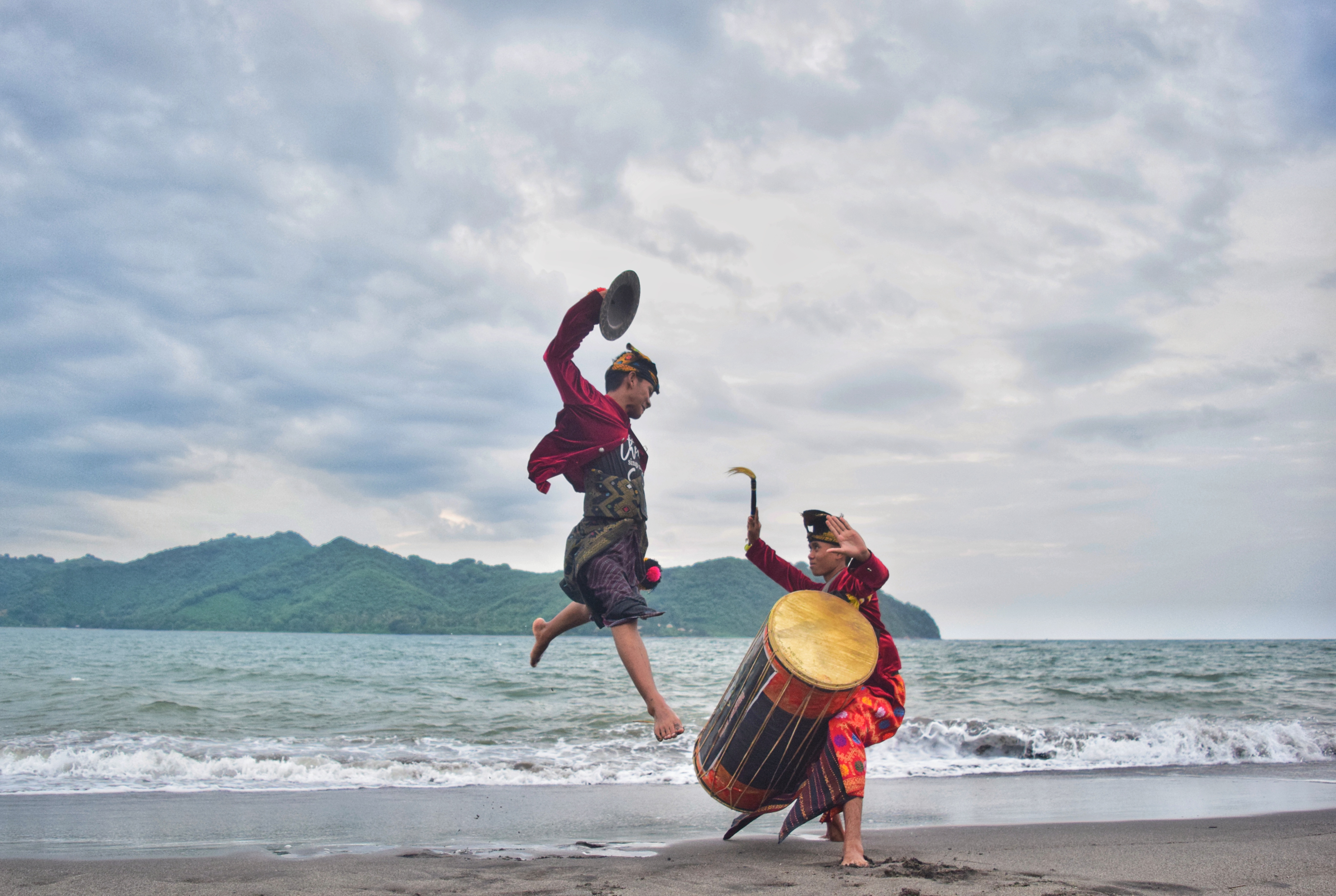
The big drum (gendang beleq) musicians, the main players in the ensemble.

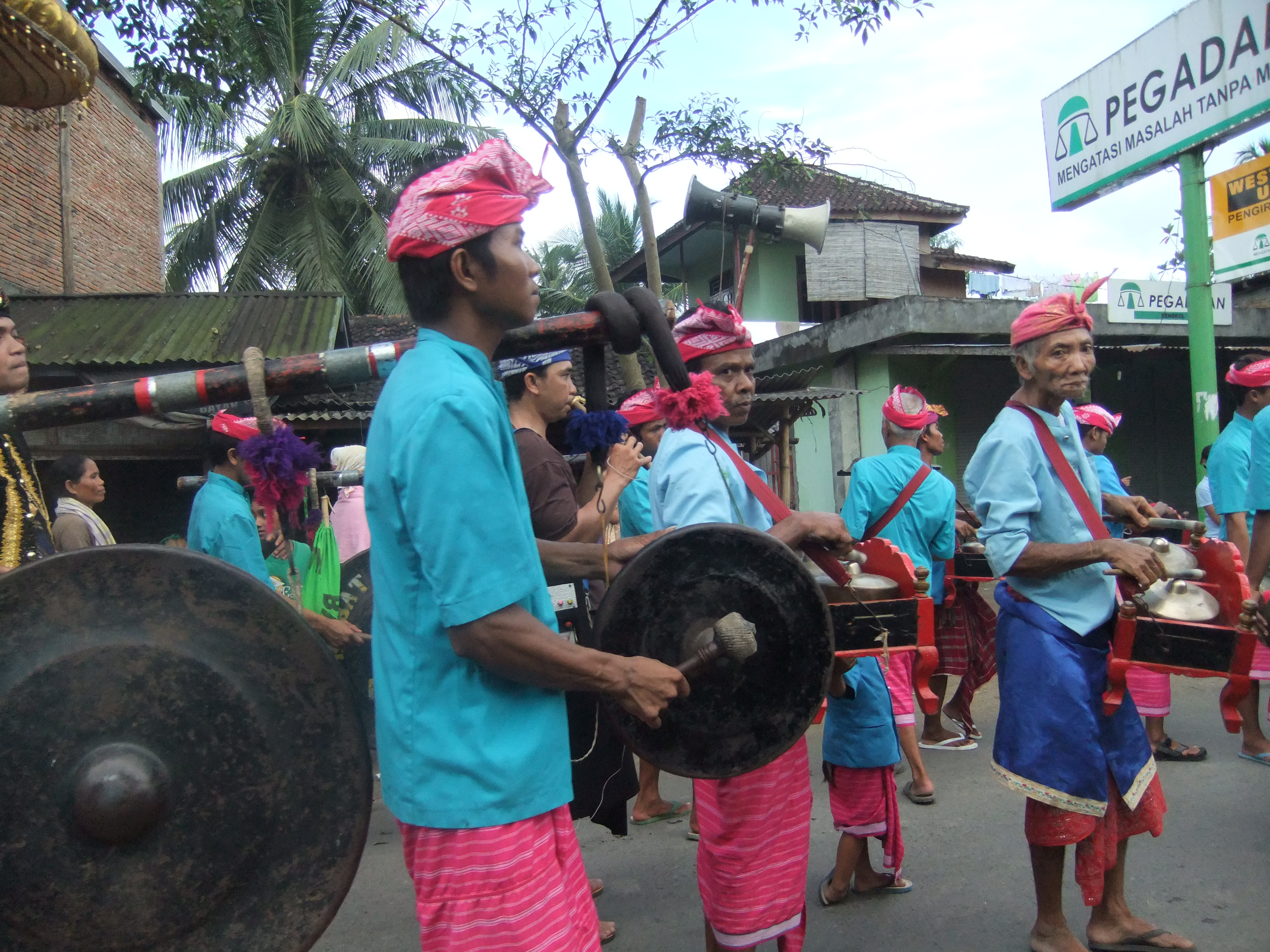
The accompanying gong beleg players.

The ensemble for gendang beleq performance consists of main players with of two (occasionally four) large drums, beaten on the right hand with a mallet. Today however the maximum size of the drum section is 6 to 14 drummers, depending on the group or ensemble. They are followed by players using a gong, a traditional flute (suling), some hand-held kettle-gongs (similar to bonang), today shoulder mounted, and many cymbalists (Ceng-Ceng). The size of the ensemble is usually 12–19 persons, with three people to carry and play the heavy gong and a loudspeaker carrier.

The drum is made from a wood frame with goat skin drum-head. The wood is selected from woods which is hard yet light. The goat skin is selected from goats that are approximately 5 years old to make drums with the best sound. There are two different types of gendang used in the ensemble: the male and female gendang. Each is made from a male and female goat. These two types of gendang have different sound quality.

The player for the ensemble is called sekehe. It is composed of males only (usually young boys). There are many gendang beleq clubs in Lombok island. These clubs are supported and sponsored by the Indonesian government and the governments of the local townships as a way to promote Sasak culture and to involve the youth in cultural activities. The clubs usually practice once a week. During performances, the players will use colorful traditional Sasak dress, which is similar to the related Balinese dress.

== History ==
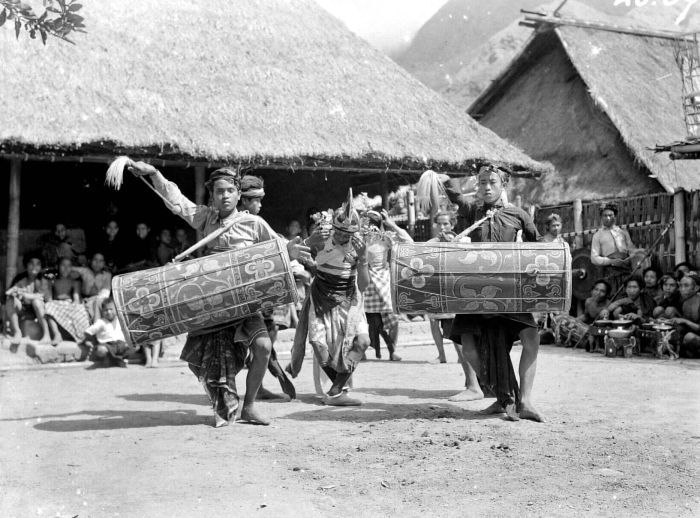
Gendang beleq performance during colonial era. ca. 1934.

Gendang Beleq is a variant of gamelan oncer, a gamelan form in Lombok. It is used for ritual purposes and as a performance to encourage Sasak warriors that were going into, or returning from, the battlefield. It is part also of the ceremony in Pura Lingsar, one of the main Hindu temples in Lombok.

The popularity of Gendang Beleq has increased since the 1990s due to support and promotion by the Indonesian government to promote local art performances. Presently the performance is not only in a ritual context but also in cultural festivals or for tourist performances.

== Performances ==
In a Gendang beleq performance, the drummers carry and play gendang and dance a dramatic and confrontational duet. The drummers play interlocking tune with their large drums. Aside from able to play their instruments, the players must have the agility and stamina to perform the dance and marching with their instrument.

Gendang beleq can be performed during life-cycle ceremonies, such as celebration of birth, circumcision, wedding and funeral. It can also be performed in a ceremony to invoke rainfall or in a celebrations for national holidays.

In Sasak wedding, gendang beleq performance is part of the nyongkolan ceremony, where the family of the groom went in a parade to the bride's house to bring her to the location of the marriage ceremony.

The West Nusa Tenggara provincial government held "The Master of Gendang Beleq" competition where gendang beleq players compete to decide the best team. It is held in front of Governor office in Mataram, Lombok.

Outside Lombok, the performance is popular among migrant Sasak in other islands of Indonesia, such as in the neighbouring Sumbawa Island.

== See also ==
- Gamelan and Kulintang ensemble
- Tanggai dance
