= Barong dance =

Indonesian traditional dance

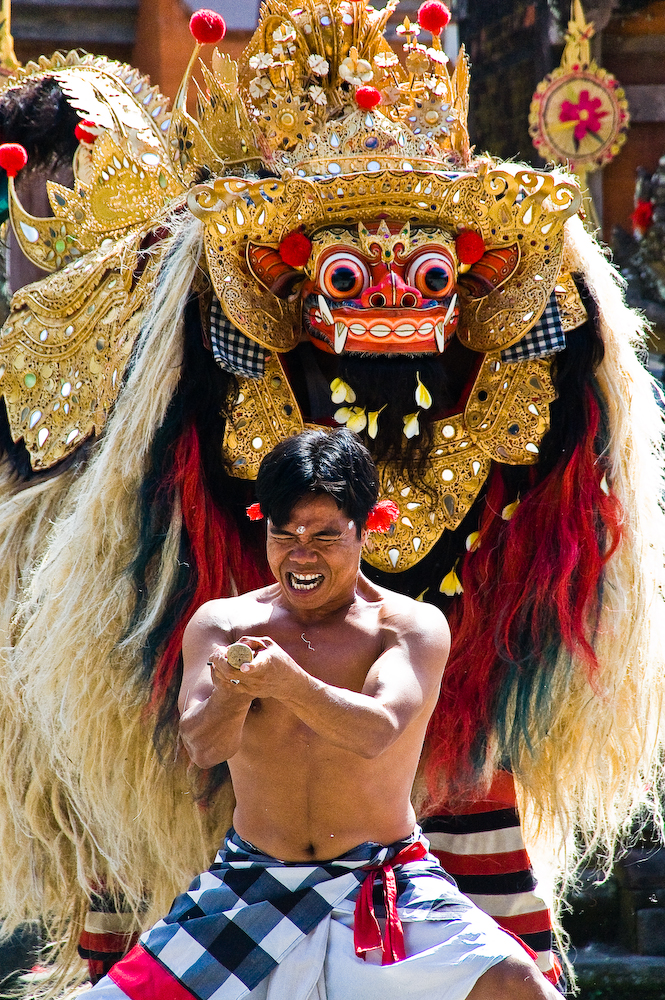
- Barong and kris-wielding dancer
- Native name: ᬩᬅᬭᬑᬂ (Balinese); Tari Barong (Indonesian)
- Instrument(s): Gamelan, Gong, Kendhang
- Inventor: Balinese
- Origin: Indonesia

Three genres of traditional dance in Bali
- UNESCO Intangible Cultural Heritage
- Country: Indonesia
- Reference: 00617
- Region: Asia and the Pacific

Inscription history
- Inscription: 2015 (10th session)
- List: Representative
- Wali Sacred Dances (Rejang, Sanghyang Dedari, Baris Upacara), Bebali Semi sacred Dances (Topeng Sidhakarya/Topeng Pajegan, Gambuh dance drama, Wayang Wong dance drama), Balih-balihan Entertainment Dances (Legong Kraton, Joged Bumbung, Barong Ket)

Barong dance (Balinese: ᬩᬅᬭᬑᬂ) is a style of traditional Balinese from Bali, Indonesia. The dance demonstrates about the mythological depiction of animals that have supernatural powers and the ability to protect humans. Barong is the king of the spirits, leader of the hosts of good, and the enemy of Rangda, the demon queen and mother of all spirit guardians in the mythological traditions of Bali. The Barong dance featured a battle between Barong and Rangda to represent the eternal battle between good and evil.

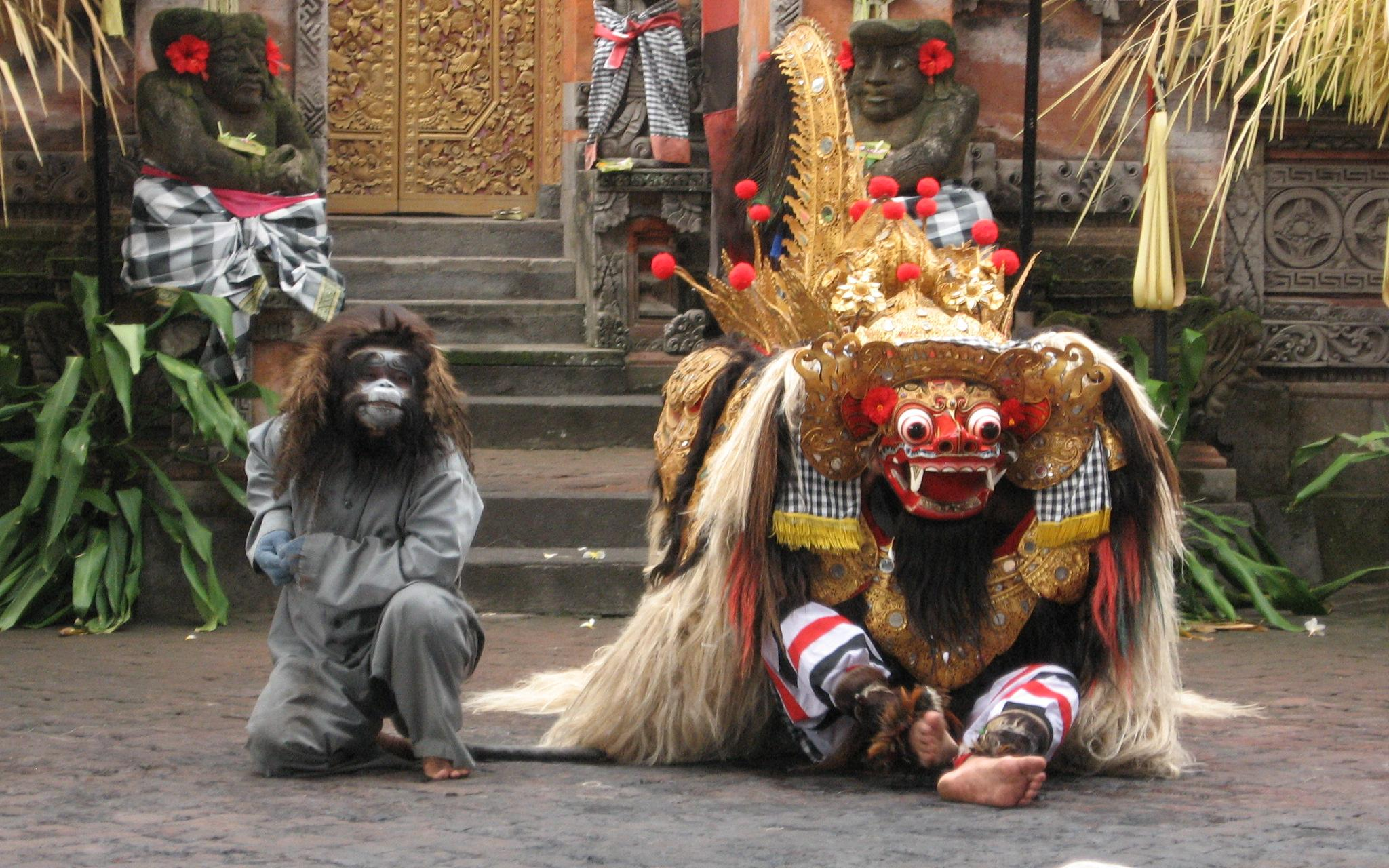
Barong and bojog (monkey)

== Balinese Barong ==
The Barong is a type of mythical lion, which is a popular dance in Bali. The dance originated in the Gianyar region, specifically Ubud, a popular destination for tourists to watch Balinese dance rituals. Within the Calon Arang, the dance drama in which the Barong appears, the Barong responds to Rangda's use of magic to control and kill her to restore balance. In traditional Barong dance performances, he is portrayed in his struggles against Rangda, a popular part of Balinese culture. The mythical creature would dance along the street to the Calon Arang dance. A priest would throw holy water at it. The dance opens with two playful monkeys teasing Barong in a peaceful environment.

A barong dance on Bali in 1962
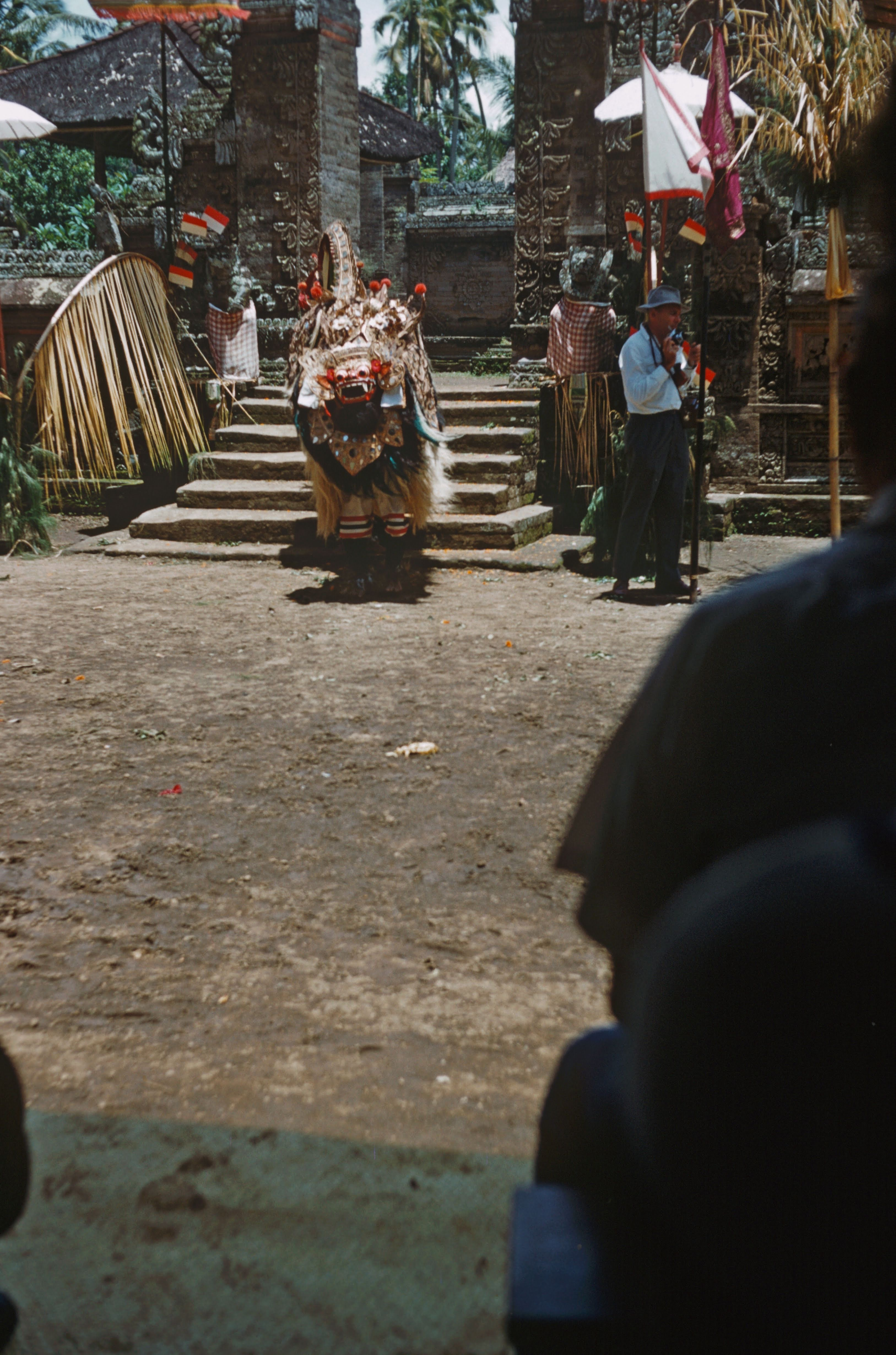

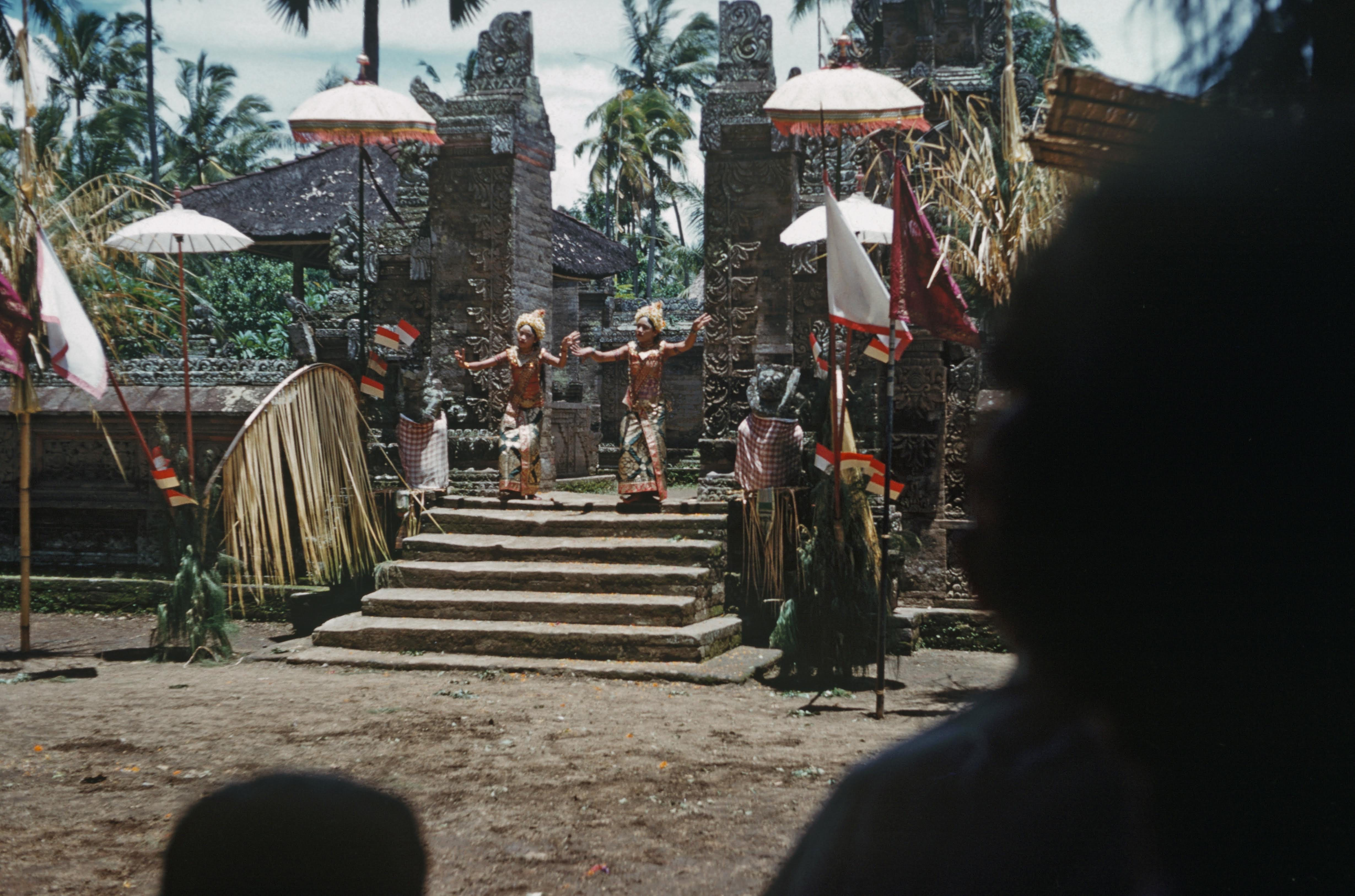

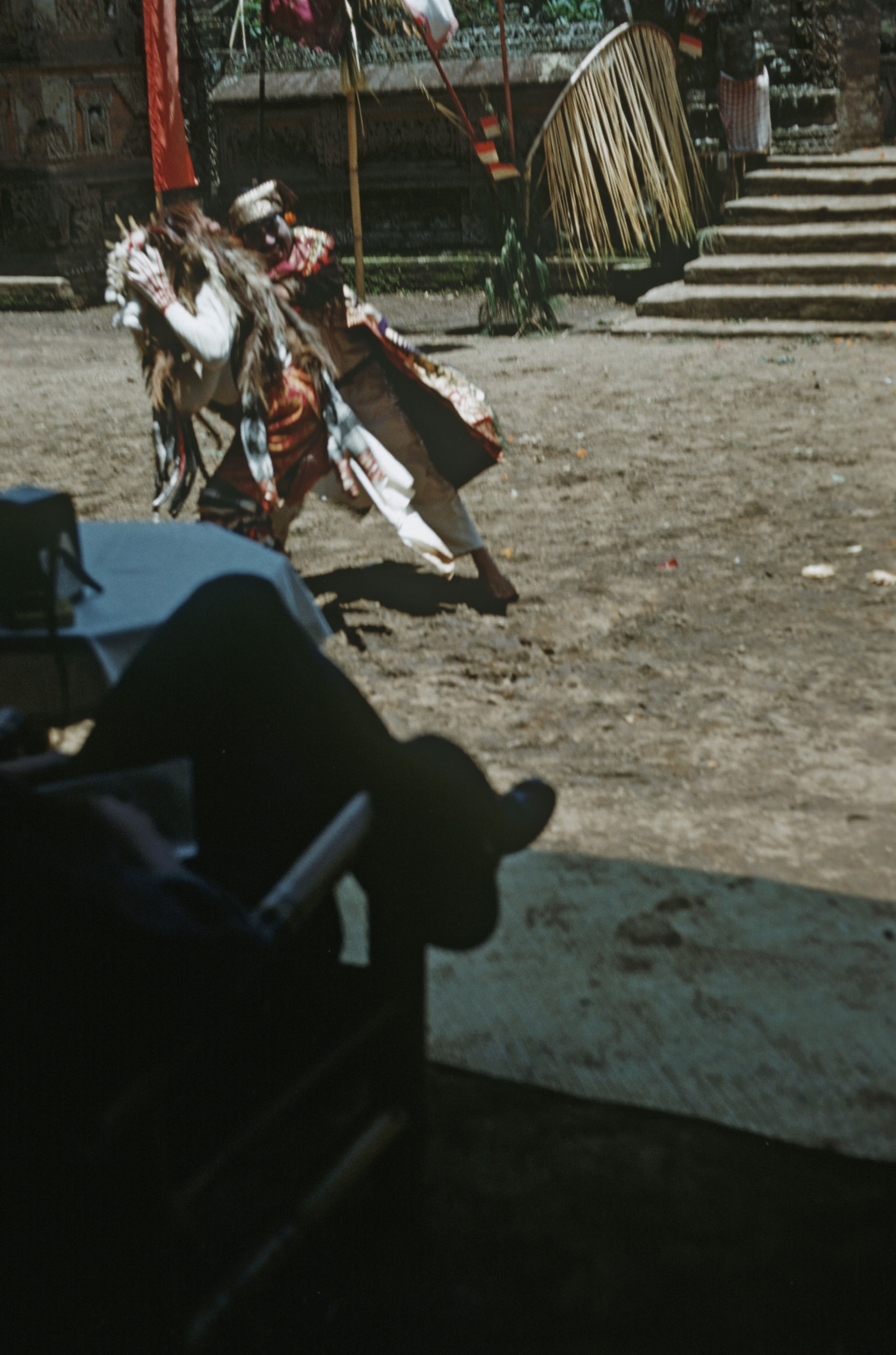

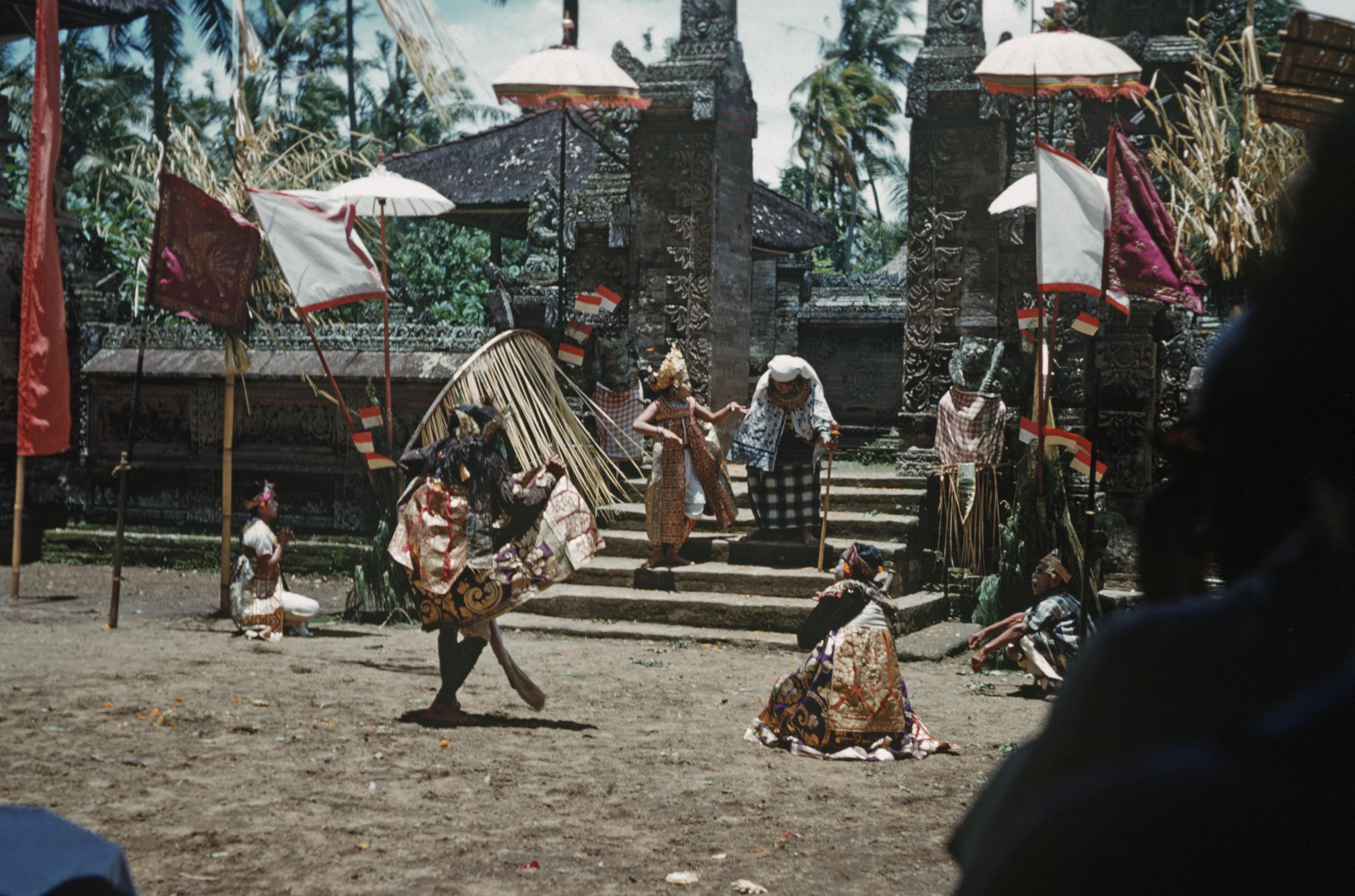

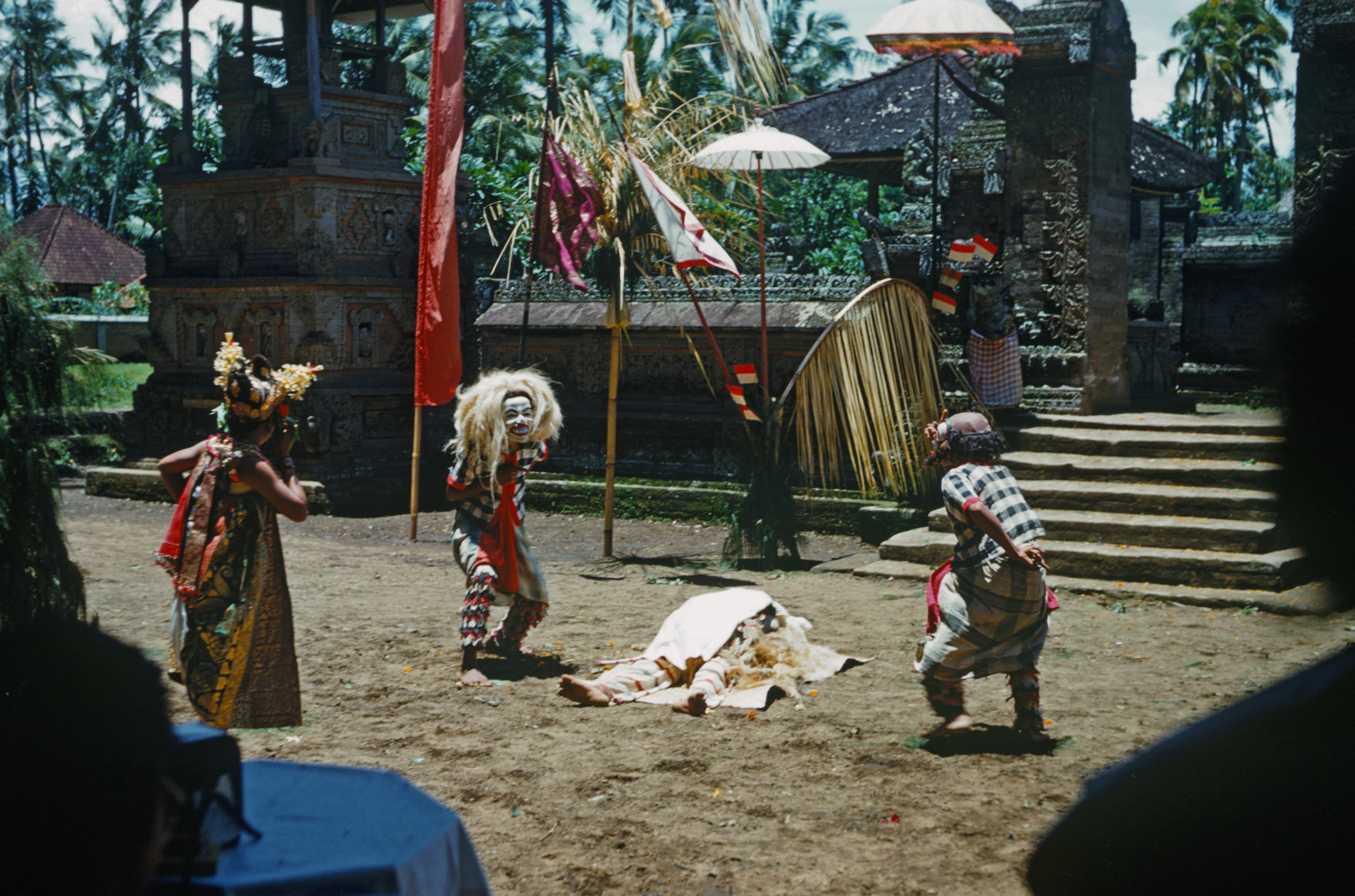

=== Keris dance ===
The Balinese keris dance is a segment of a Barong dance performance depicting a battle between Barong and Rangda, in which the dancers wield krises as weapons. The keris dance is considered sacred since it involves magical trance.

During the scene, Rangda appears and casts black magic upon the male dancers, who represent Airlangga's soldiers, and orders them to commit suicide. Meanwhile, Barong and the priest cast protective magic on them, making them invulnerable to sharp objects. In a trance, the soldiers stab themselves with their kris, but remain unhurt.

The keris dance carries the risk for potentially deadly accidents. In February 2021, a 16-year-old male dancer died after being stabbed by his own kris, during a Rangda dance performance in Banjar Blong Gede, Pemecutan Kaja, Denpasar, Bali.

=== Barong versus Rangda ===
The dance ends with the final battle between Barong and Rangda, concluding with Barong's victory. Rangda runs away, the evil is defeated, and the celestial order is restored.

== Other version ==
=== Javanese reog ===
The Reog dance of Ponorogo in Java involves a lion figure known as the singa barong. It is held on special occasions such as the Lebaran (Eid al-Fitr), City or Regency anniversary, or Independence day carnival. A single dancer, or warok, carries the heavy lion mask about 30 – 40 kg weight by his teeth. He is credited with exceptional strength. The warok may also carry an adolescent boy or girl on its head. When holding an adolescent boy or girl on his head, the Reog dancer holds the weight up to total 100 kilograms. The great mask that spans over 2.5 meters with genuine tiger or leopard skin and real peacock feathers. It has gained international recognition as the world's largest mask.

=== Chinese barongsai ===
Barongsai is referred to Chinese lion dance, often performed by Chinese Indonesian during Imlek. The barongsai has different forms that are distinct to the Balinese barong and Javanese reog, and it is not known if these have any relation to the Chinese lion.

== See also ==
- Balinese dance
- Barong (mythology)
- Dance in Indonesia
