= Oleg dance =

Indonesian traditional dance

Oleg
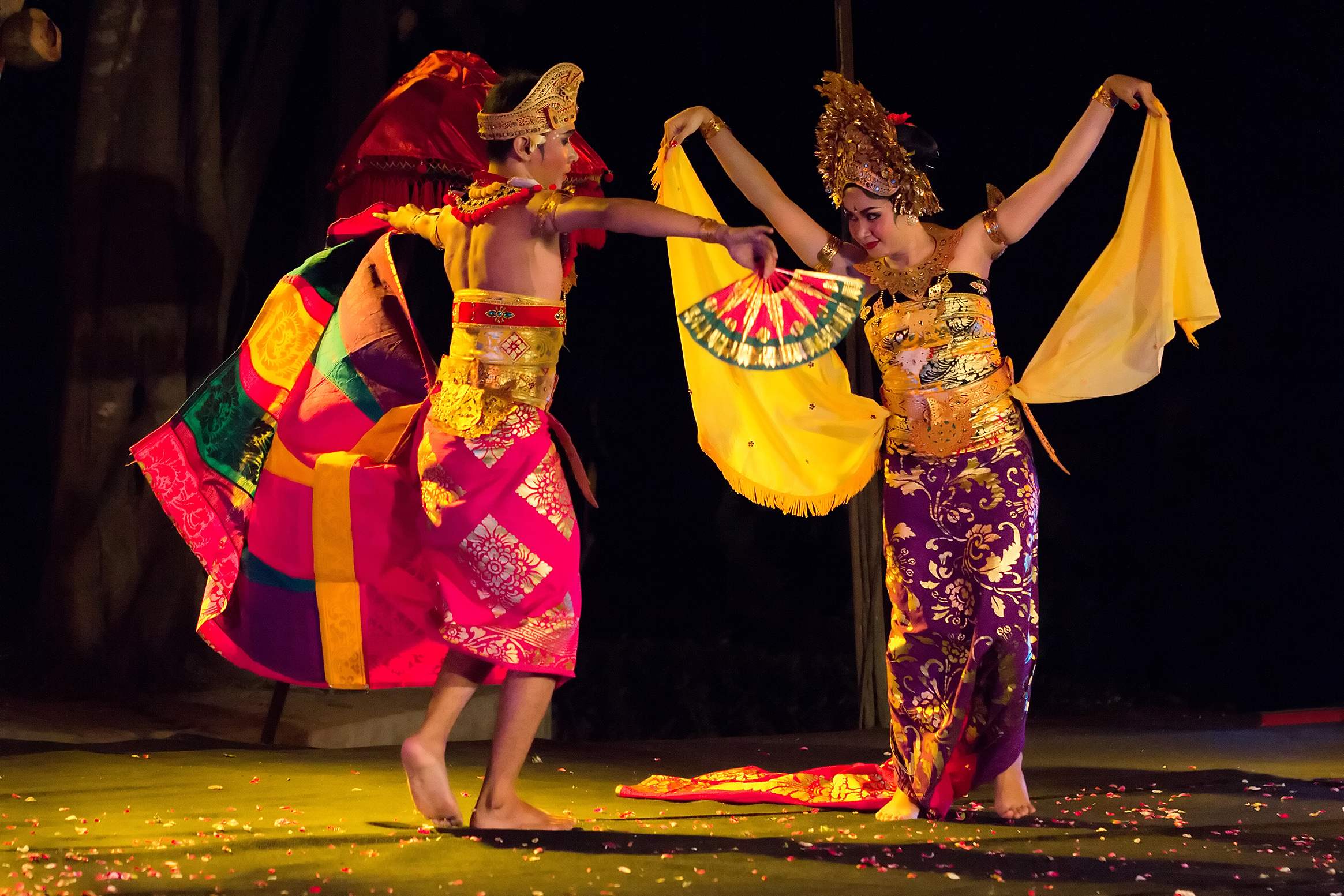
- Sanata Dharma University's Balinese dance troupe "Sekar Jepun" performing an Oleg dance
- Native name: ᬳᭀᬮᬾᬕ᭄ (Balinese); Tari Oleg (Indonesian)
- Inventor: Balinese
- Origin: Indonesia

Oleg (Balinese: ᬳᭀᬮᬾᬕ᭄), or also known by its conventional long name Oleg Tamulilingan or Oleg Tambulilingan) is a form of traditional Balinese dance originated from the Indonesian island of Bali which featured unique dance movements that symbolizes the wild life of bumblebees, thus sometimes it is also colloquially known as 'Balinese bumblebee dance'.

== Performance ==
Oleg is performed by male and female dancers. It is intended to be evocative of a garden in which bees are buzzing about, collecting nectar from the waiting flowers. The dancers represent a male and female bee, with the obsessively flirtatious male chasing the female from one flower to another. Though the female bee at first appears coquettish, she eventually accepts the male's advances. The movements of the female dancer are considered more complex than those of the male.

The male and female dancers wear different costumes. The female is clad in a traditional fabric known as a prada, which is covered in gold paint, and has a long, sheer scarf to serve as her wings. On her head she wears a bouquet of flowers. The male dancer, meanwhile, wears similar fabric, which is arranged differently on his body so that it trails behind him. On his head he wears an udeng, a traditional Balinese hat, while in his hand he carries a fan.

Owing to its bee and garden symbolism, which Kartika Suardana suggests is intended to convey the message that "both sexes naturally need each other", oleg is often referred to as "the dance of the bumblebees". It is one of numerous animal-themed dances in Bali, a genre which also includes the cendrawasih (bird-of-paradise) dance.

== History ==
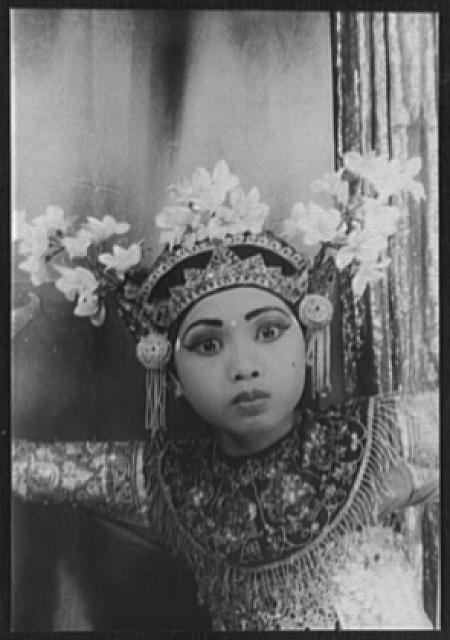
Ni Gusti Ayu Raka Rasmi (1952)

Oleg was first choreographed by I Ketut Marya (better known in the West as I Mario) of Tabanan, Bali, in 1952 at the request of the music presenter John Coast, who intended to take a group of Balinese dancers on tour in Europe and the United States. Though I Mario, who had previously adapted the gamelan gong kebyar style of Balinese music into the kebyar duduk dance in 1925, considered himself too old to design a dance, he acquiesced after Coast continued to pressure him. I Mario, working with Coast, the dancer I Wayan Sampih, and several other musicians, ultimately drew on images of ballet to create a fusion of Western and Balinese dance styles, while still promoting the dance as traditional. Coast's wife designed the original costumes for the dance, which was tested on Western audiences in Bali. I Gusti Rasmin Raka and Sampih were the first dancers of oleg. Young Balinese dancer Raka Rasmi was the first to perform the dance.

Though initially controversial among traditionalists, as the female dancers had to raise their arms and expose their armpits to "fly", oleg was absorbed into the canon of Balinese dance. Young children, many of whom had previously danced legong, learned oleg. In his 2013 examination of the position of modern Balinese dance, Andrew McGraw considered oleg a now-classic kebyar dance. In The Rough Guide to Bali and Lombok, Lesley Reader and Lucy Ridout described oleg as "one of the most vivacious, humorous, and engaging dances of the Balinese repertoire".

== See also ==
- Kecak
- Balinese dance
- Dance in Indonesia

== Works cited ==
- Dibia, I; Ballinger, Rucina (2004). Balinese Dance, Drama & Music: A Guide to the Performing Arts of Bali. Tuttle. ISBN 978-962-593-195-1.
- McGraw, Andrew Clay (2013). Radical Traditions: Reimagining Culture in Balinese Contemporary Music. Oxford: Oxford University Press. ISBN 978-0-19-994141-4.
- McIntosh, Jonathan (2013). "Negotiating Musical Boundaries and Frontiers: Tourism, Child Performers, and the Tourist-Ethnographer in Bali, Indonesia". In Simone Krüger; Ruxandra Trandafoiu (eds.). The Globalization of Musics in Transit: Music Migration and Tourism. Routledge studies in ethnomusicology. Vol. 4. New York: Routledge. pp. 59–85. ISBN 978-0-415-64007-7.
- Reader, Lesley; Ridout, Lucy (2011). The Rough Guide to Bali & Lombok. London: Rough Guides. ISBN 978-1-4053-8135-2.
- Suardana, Kartika D (2012). Dances of Bali. Kuta: Now! Bali. ISBN 978-602-97971-1-4.
