= Tanggai dance =

Indonesian traditional dance

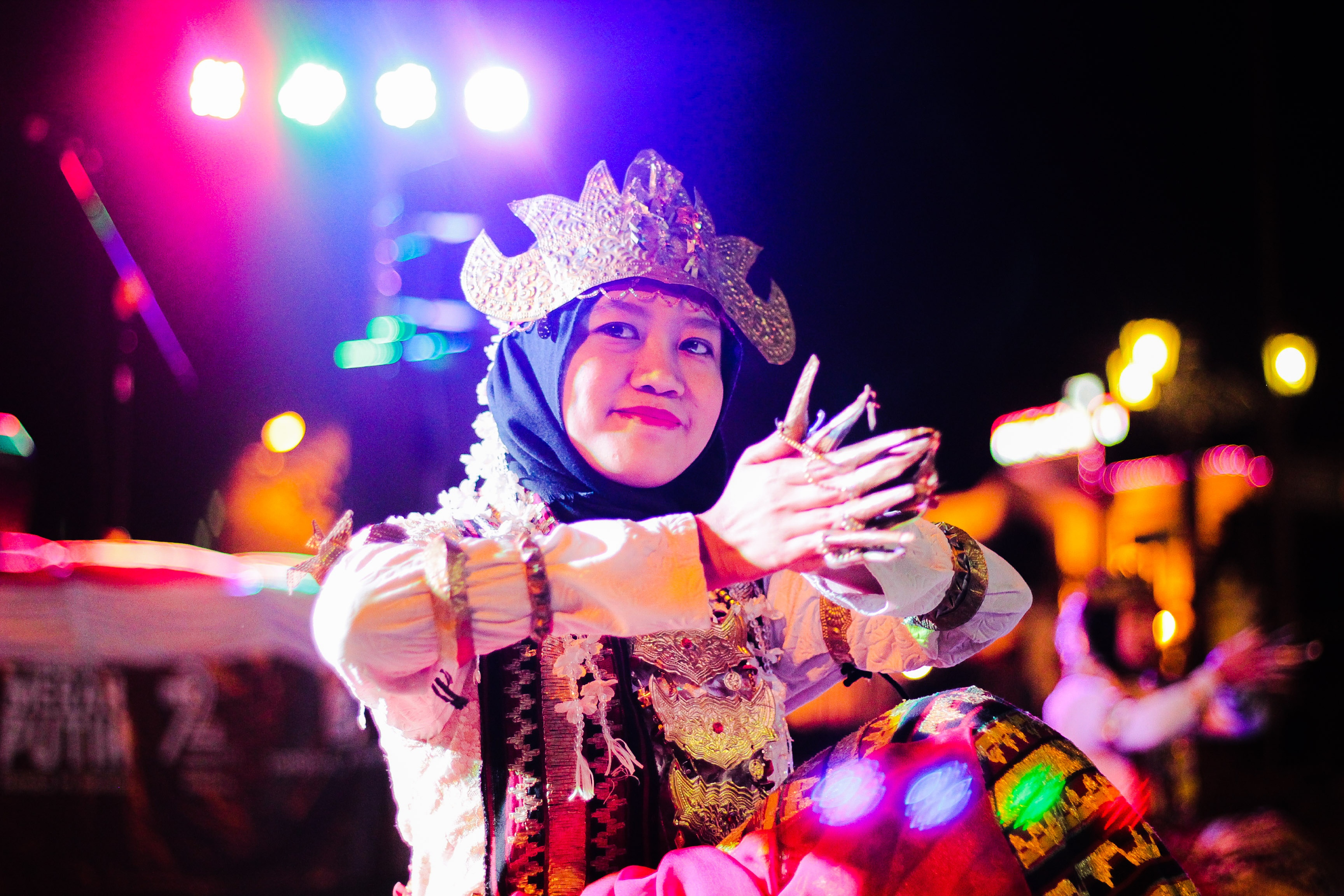
- Tanggai dancers in Palembang
- Native name: Tari Tanggai
- Origin: Palembang, Indonesia

Tanggai dance (also known as the Long Fingernail dance) is an Indonesian traditional dance performed to welcome people in the weddings. Tanggai dance (also known as the Long Fingernail dance) is Palembangnese traditional dance performed to welcome honorable guests and people in formal events or weddings. In 1965, Tanggai dance was created by Mrs. Elly Rudy (76), the South Sumatran Dance Maestro and the Indonesian Dance Legend, after the banning of Gending Sriwijaya Dance and Dong, the Welcome Dance which also uses long finger nails (the tanggai) and carries a small wooden box (the tepak), for political reasons. In 1965, in Jakarta, on the initiative of the late Raden Husin Natodirajo and Mgs. Nungcik Asaari, both were the two famous Palembang cultural figures, Mrs. Elly Rudy created Tanggai Dance carrying tepak and wearing tanggai. This dance is also functioned as the Welcome Dance to welcome the arrival of noble guests who came to visit Palembang. This has been reinforced by the late Palembang cultural observer R. Johan Hanafiah. So, Mrs. Elly Rudy created a dance entitled Tari Tanggai using the song "Enam Saudara" (the six brothers). The dance is practiced in Palembang.

== See also ==
- Gendhing
- Srivijaya
