= Rudat dance =

Traditional Indonesian dance

- Genre: Traditional dance
- Inventor: Sasak people
- Origin: Indonesia

Rudat dance is a traditional dance of Sasak people in Lombok, West Nusa Tenggara, originated from Indonesia. This dance demonstrates pancak silat martial art movements. Rudat dance might be performed by a group costumed and dressed up like prajurit (warrior) with a songkok.

Rudat dance is usually performed as a ceremonial welcoming dance to honor the guests and elders to a traditional ceremony.

== See also ==
- Dance in Indonesia
- Kabasaran
- Kecak
- Zapin
