= Dance in Indonesia =

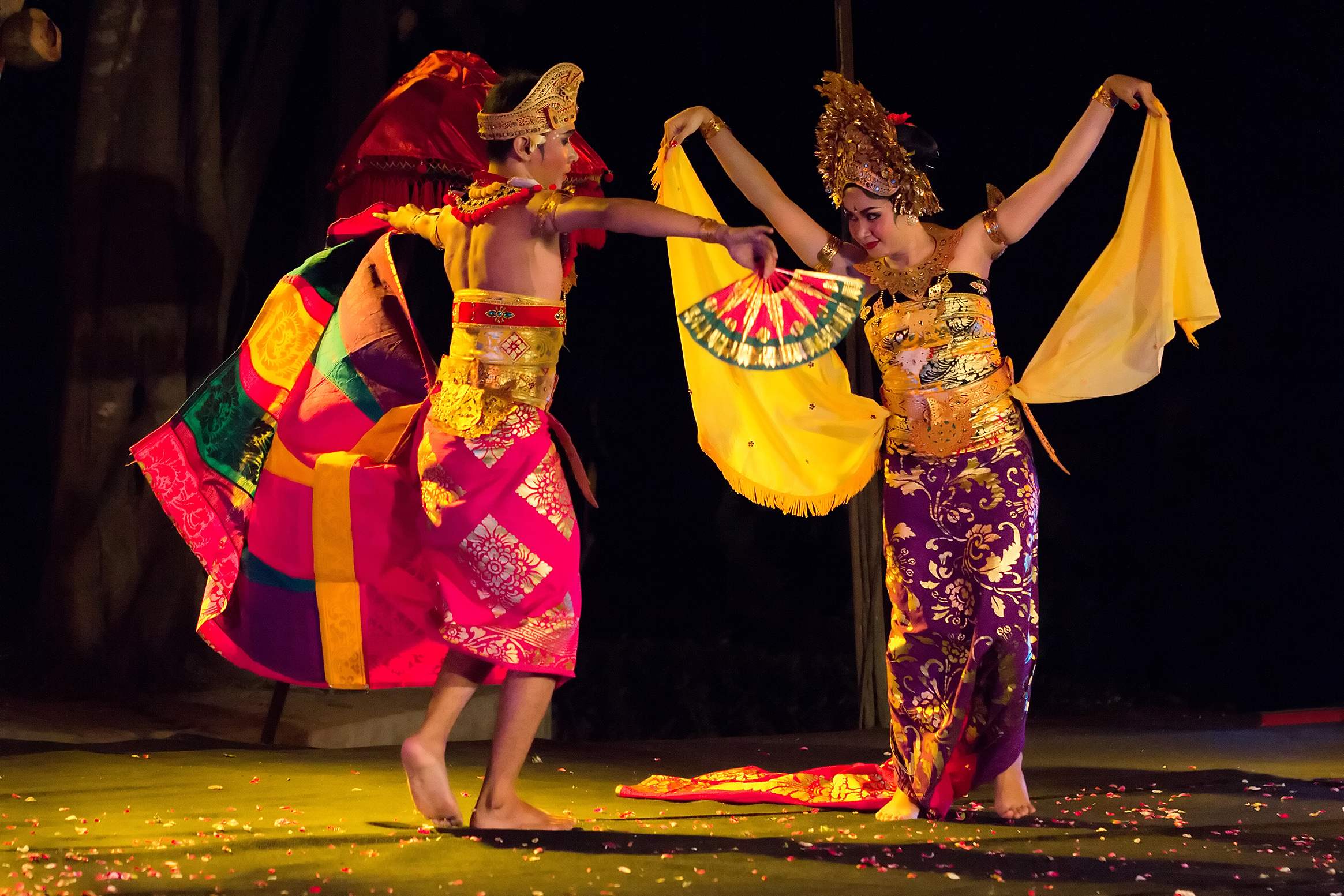
- Oleg Balinese dance performed by a pair of dancers
- Native name: Tarian Indonesia
- Instrument: Indonesian music
- Inventor: Indonesian
- Origin: Indonesia

Dance in Indonesia (Indonesian: Tarian Indonesia) reflects the country's diversity of ethnicities and cultures. There are more than 600 ethnic groups in Indonesia. Austronesian roots and Melanesian tribal forms are visible, and influences ranging from neighboring Asian and even western styles through colonization. Each ethnic group has its own dances: there are more than 3,000 original dance forms in Indonesia. The old traditions of dance and drama are being preserved in the numerous dance schools which flourish not only in the courts but also in the modern, government-run or supervised art academies.

For classification purposes, the dances of Indonesia can be divided according to several aspects. In the historical aspect it can be divided into three eras; the prehistoric-tribal era, the Hindu-Buddhist era, and the era of Islam. According to its patrons, it can be divided into two genres; court dance and folk dance. In its tradition, Indonesian dances can be divided into two types; traditional dance and contemporary dance.

UNESCO announced the traditional Saman dance from Aceh province as a world Intangible Cultural Heritage on 19 November, 2011, in Bali. Saman dance is unique due to its speedy movements and the harmony between dancers.

On 2 December 2015 UNESCO also announced Three Genres traditional Balinese dances from Bali province as a world Intangible Cultural Heritage.

== Historical eras ==
=== The Prehistoric Tribal Era ===
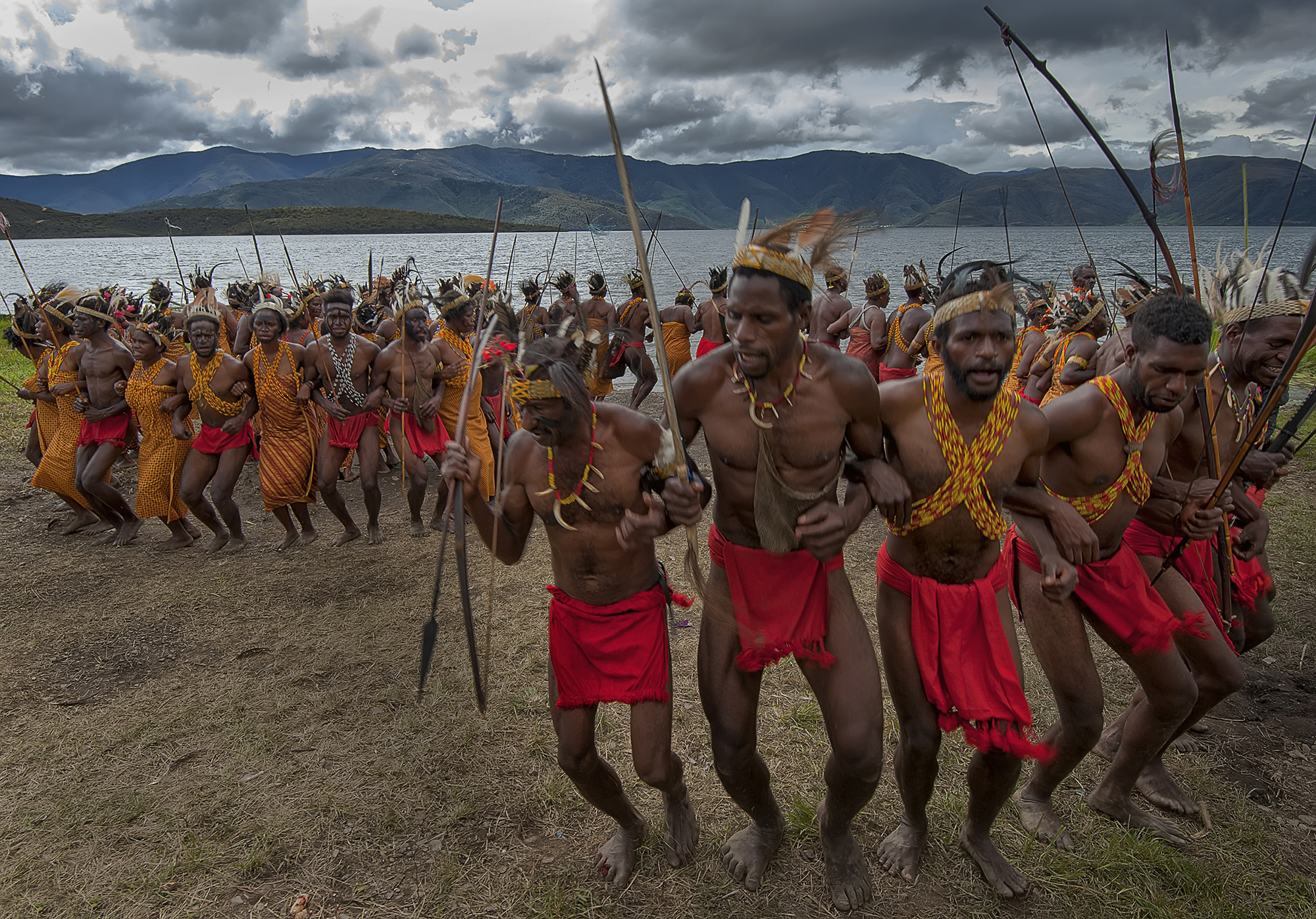
Papuan tumbu tanah dance

Prior to their contact with the outer world the people of the Indonesian archipelago had already developed their own styles of dancing, still somewhat preserved by those who resist outside influences and choose tribal life in the interior of Sumatra (example: Batak, Nias, Mentawai), of Kalimantan/Borneo (example: Dayak, Punan, Iban), of Java (example: Baduy), of Sulawesi (example: Toraja, Minahasa), of the Moluccan Islands and of Papua (example: Dani, Amungme).

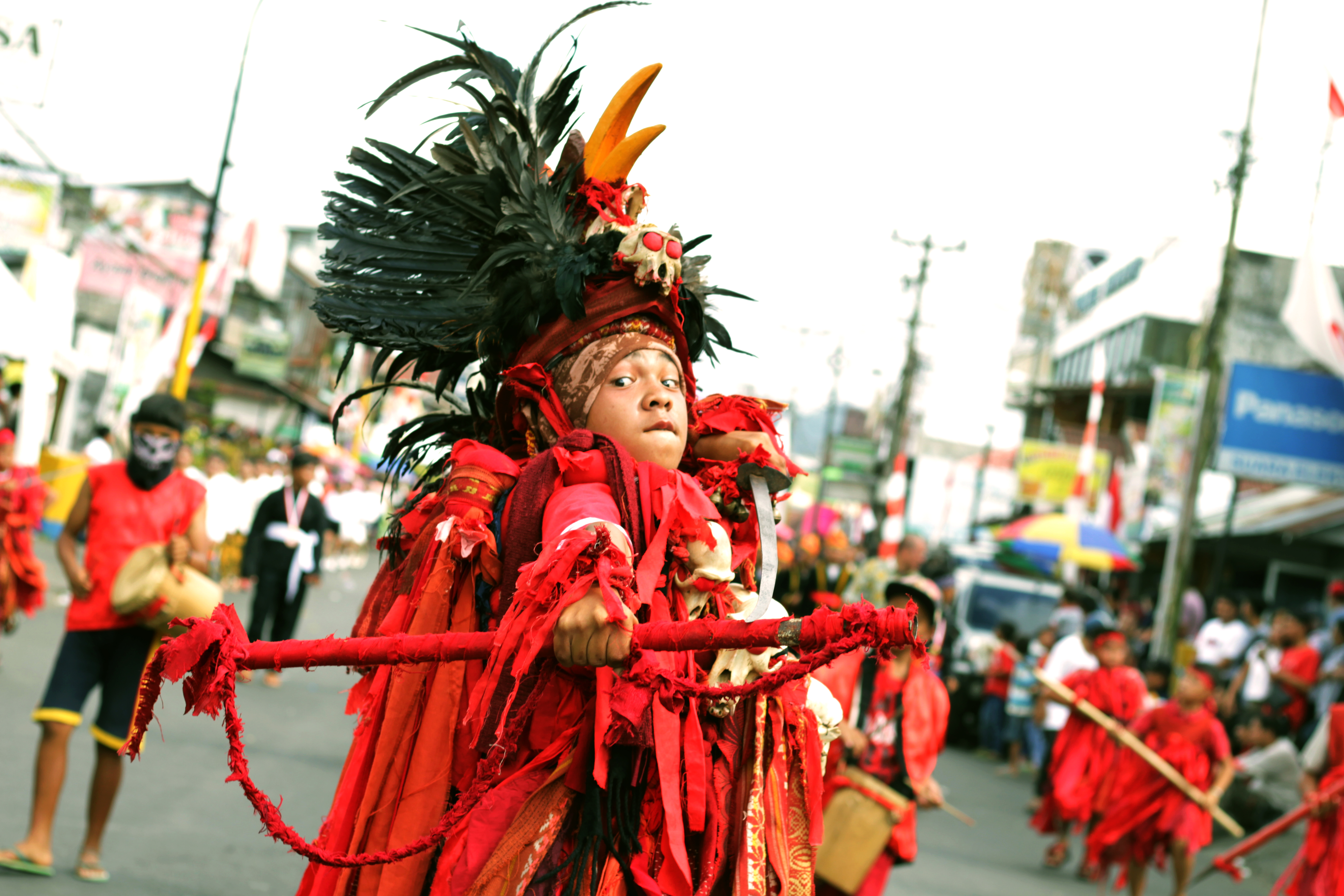
Kabasaran dance, Minahasa North Sulawesi.

Dances in Indonesia are believed by many scholars to have had their beginning in rituals and religious worship. Such dances are usually based on rituals, like the war dances, the dance of witch doctors, and dance to call for rain or any agricultural-related rituals such as Hudoq dance ritual of Dayak people. War dances such as cakalele of Maluku and kabasaran dance of Minahasa, North Sulawesi. Others are inspired by nature, such as the Tari Merak (Peafowl dance) of West Java. Ancient forms are usually characterized by repetitive movements like the Tor-Tor dance of the Batak people of (North Sumatra). The dancing is also meant to let the human's inner spirit come out, and also to calm or appease the spirits. Some of the tribal dances involving trance mental condition, which is interpreted as channelling the spirits through the dancer's body movements. Tari Sanghyang Dedari is a special dance of Bali, in which the dancers are pre-pubescent girls in trance, chasing away bad spirits. The dance of kuda lumping and keris dance also involves trance.

=== The Hindu-Buddhist Era ===
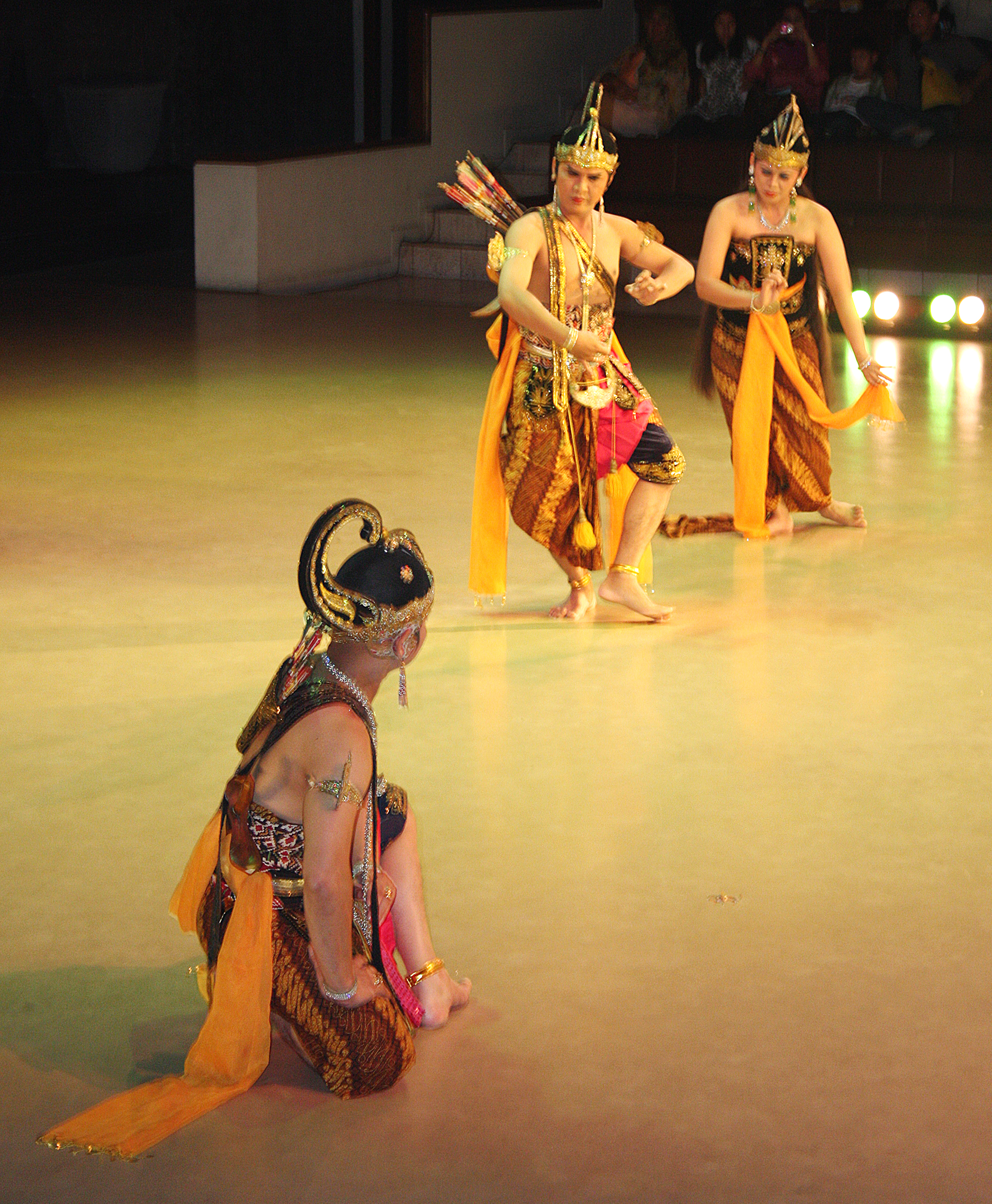
Lakshmana, Rama and Shinta in Ramayana ballet at Prambanan, Java.

With the advent of Dharmic religions in Indonesia, Hinduism and Buddhism were celebrated in ritual and in art. Although the poem originates in India, Ramayana and Mahabharata epic has long been adopted by the Javanese people. Etchings of the story can be found on temples dating back to the tenth century CE, and have since then played a recurring role in ancient Javanese literature as well as wayang shows.

They incorporated stories of the Ramayana, Mahabharata and also Panji cycles into dance-drama, which is called sendratari (dance-drama) or sometimes simply translated as "ballet", such as Ramayana Ballet of Java and Bali. Highly stylized methods of dance were developed and are still obvious nowadays, especially in the islands of Java and Bali. The Javanese Ramayana dance-drama is regularly staged and performed in ninth century Prambanan temple compound, Yogyakarta; while its Balinese counterpart is also performed in various Balinese temples throughout the island. The Javanese wayang wong dance-drama took stories from the episodes of the Ramayana or the Mahabharata Hindu epic. However, the dances are distinct from those of India. While hand gestures are still very important, Indonesian dancers do not have the Indian attention to mudra: instead the dances incorporate local forms. Javanese court dances stressed graceful and slow movements, while the dances of the Balinese court are more dynamic and very expressive. The Javanese sacred ritual dance of Bedhaya has very gentle and elegant moves. It is believed to have its root in 14th century Majapahit court or probably earlier, which originated as a ritual dance performed by virgins to worship Indic deities such as Shiva, Brahma, and Vishnu.

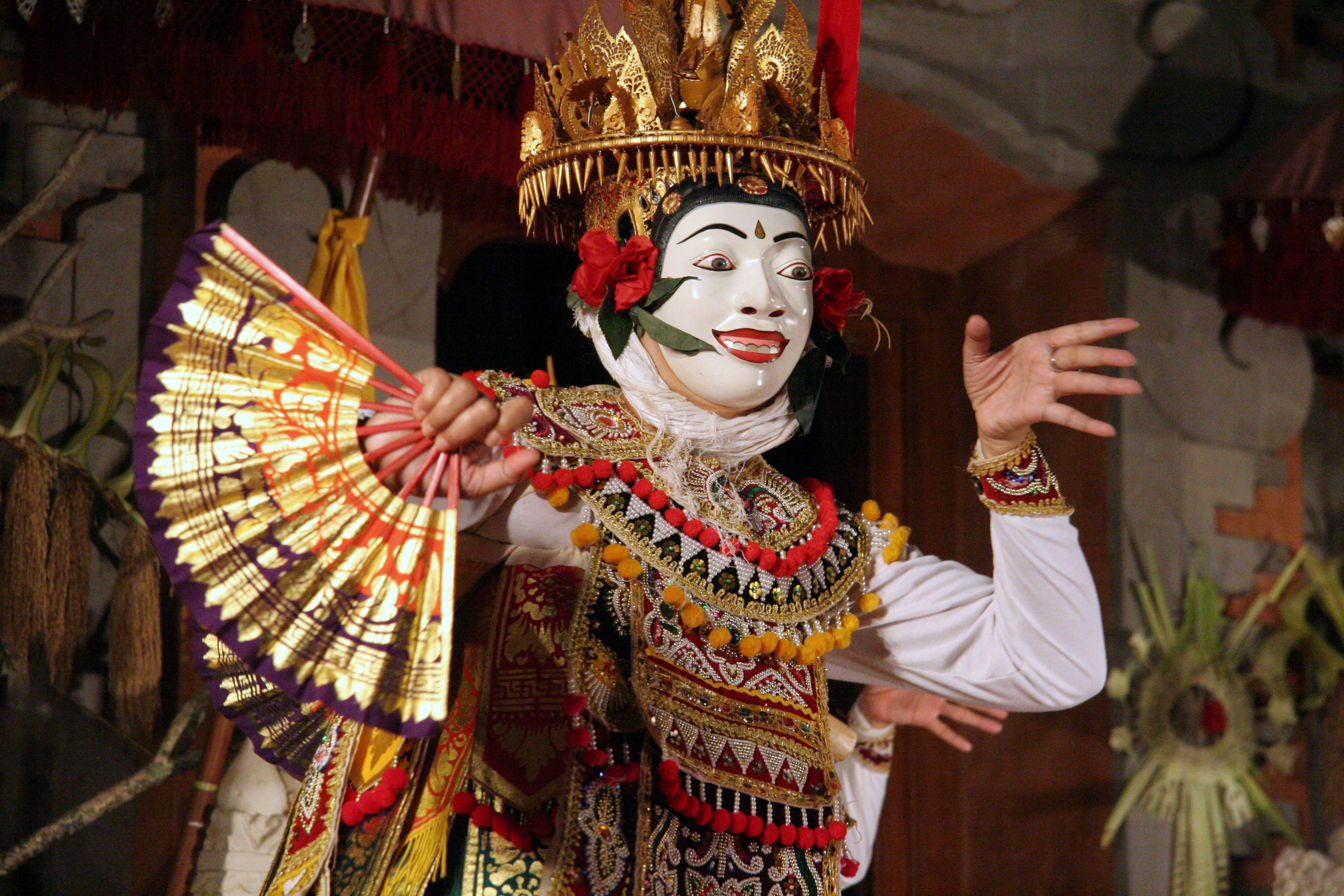
Topeng dance performance.

In Bali, dances have become an integral part of Hindu Balinese rituals. Experts believed that Balinese dance derived from the older dance tradition of Java. Friezes on East Javanese temples built during the 14th century show headdresses almost identical to those still being used for dances in Bali today. These represent a remarkable unbroken continuity of form, at least 600 years old. Certain sacred dances are reserved and only performed during certain religious ceremonies. Each Balinese dances have special functions, from sacred ritual dances performed only in Balinese temples, such as sacred sanghyang dedari and Barong dance that involved trance, dance drama that retold the legends and popular stories, such as legong and kecak, to the dance for welcoming guests, such as pendet or social youth dance, such as joged. The topeng dance is also popular in Java and Bali; it often took its story from Panji tales, originated from 12th century Kediri kingdom. The notable topeng dances are topeng Cirebon dance, Sundanese topeng Priangan dance and topeng Bali dance. The Panji tales, telling the romance between Prince Panji Inu of the ancient Javanese kingdom of Jenggala with Princess Galuh Chandra Kirana of the neighboring kingdom of Kediri, continues to be a source of inspiration in both Javanese and Balinese dance traditions.

=== The Islamic Era ===
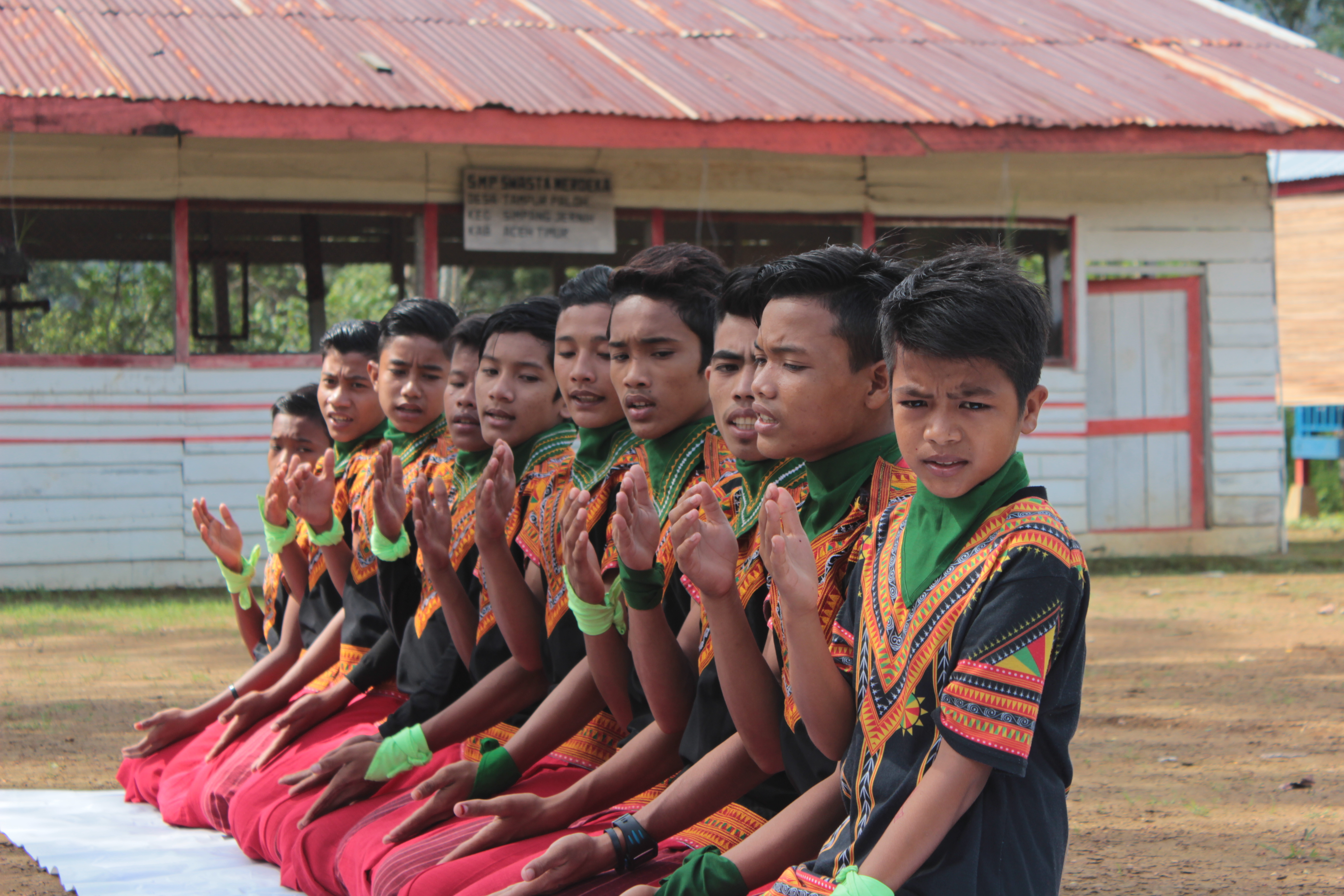
Saman dance performance from Aceh

Even as the new religion of Islam gradually penetrated the region, the native and dharmic dances continued to be popular. Artists and performers would still use the styles of the previous eras, making changes in stories (which took an Islamic turn) and clothing (which became more modest in respect of Islamic teachings). This change is obvious in Tari Persembahan from Jambi. The dancers are still adorned with the intricate gold of the Hindu/Buddhist era, but the clothing is more modest.

The new era brought newer styles of dance: Zapin dances of the Malay people and Acehnese Tari Saman adopted dance styles and musics typical of Arabia and Persia, and combined them with indigenous styles to form a newer generation of dance in the era of Islam. The adoption of Persian and Arab musical instruments, such as rebana, tambur, and gendang drums, which have become the main instruments in Islamic dances, as well as chant that often quotes Islamic chants.

=== Contemporary dances ===
Known contemporary dancers from Indonesia were Bagong Kussudiardja, who invented the contemporary dance form inspired by the Javanese classical dance.

== Patrons ==
=== The court dances ===
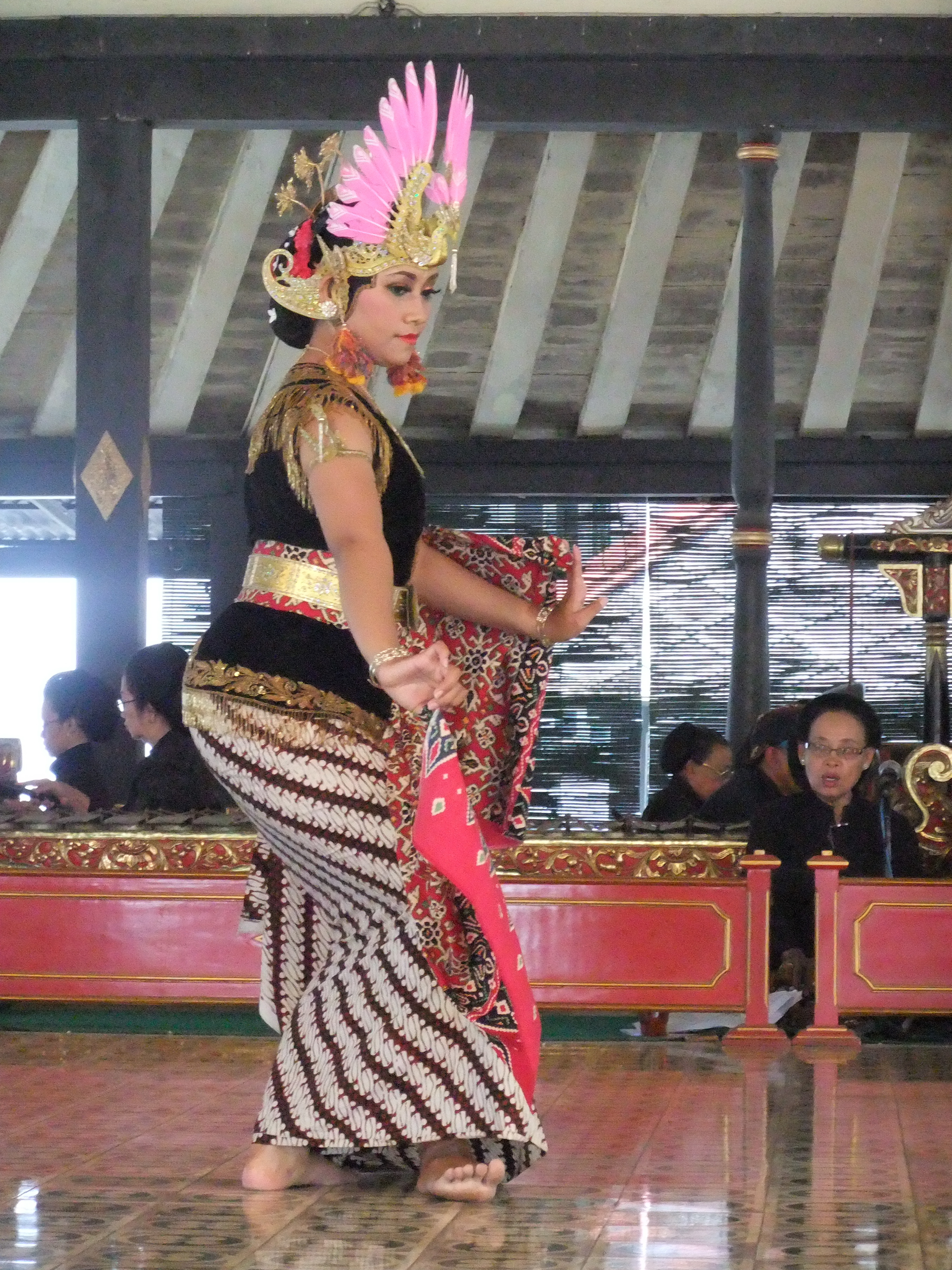
Golek Ayun-ayun, a Javanese court dance of Yogyakarta

The dances in Indonesia reflect its diverse and long history. Several royal houses, the istanas and keratons still survived in some parts of Indonesia and have become the haven of cultural conservation. The obvious difference between courtly dance and common folk dance traditions is most evident in Javanese dance. Javanese stratified social class is reflected in its culture, where the upper noble class are more concentrated and deeply concerned with refinement, spirituality, and sophistication; while the commoners are usually more interested in entertainment and the social value of the dance. As a result, court dances often have strict rules and disciplines preserved through generations, while folk dances are more liberated and open to any influences.

The royal patronage of arts and culture is often encouraged by the palace institution as the guardian of their traditions. For example, the Sultans of Yogyakarta Sultanate and Sunans of Surakarta, also nobles of Pakualaman and Mangkunegaran are known to create various Javanese court dances completed with gamelan composition to accompany the dance. For example, the Suryo Sumirat dance school of Mangkunegaran court opened its doors to public and foreign students eager to learn the royal Javanese dance. The mission is to not only produce new royal dancers but also, more importantly, to preserve ancient royal dance.

The palace court traditions are also evident in Balinese and Malay court which usually— just like Java—imposed refinement and prestige. Sumatran Malay courtly culture, such as the remnant of Aceh Sultanate, Deli Sultanate in North Sumatra, and South Sumatra Sultanate, is more influenced by Islamic culture, while Java and Bali are more deeply rooted in their Hindu-Buddhist heritage. The Palembang dance of Gending Sriwijaya, for example, still demonstrates the Hindu-Buddhist elements of gilded ornaments, but compared to its Javanese counterpart, it is rendered in a more covered and modest costume of Aesan Gede.

=== The folk dances ===
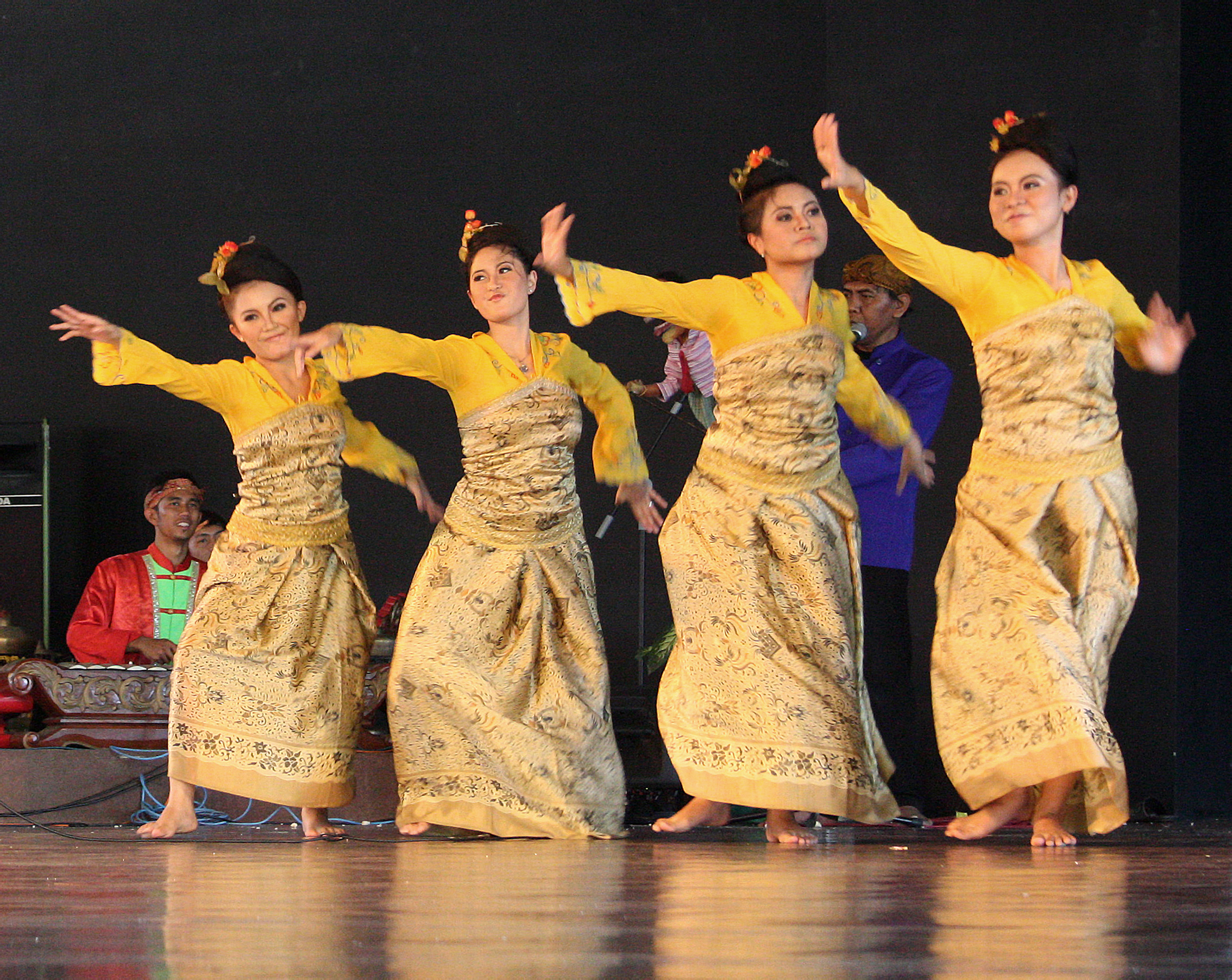
Jaipongan Mojang Priangan, Sundanese traditional folk dance

The dance in Indonesia demonstrates the social complexity and the social stratifications of its people; it often reflects the social class and also the degree of refinement. According to its patron, the folk dances were developed and fostered by common people, either in the villages or in the cities, in contrast to court dance, which is developed through royal patronage. Indonesian folk dances are often relatively free from strict rules or disciplines, although certain styles of gestures, poses and movements are still preserved. The common folk dance is more concerned with social function and entertainment value than with rituals.

The Javanese Ronggeng and Sundanese Jaipongan is a fine example of these common folk dance traditions. Both are social dances that are more for entertainment purposes than rituals. It often displays movements that are considered inappropriate in refined courtly dances; as a result, the common folk dances were often mistakenly deemed too erotic or even too crude for the court standard. However, this tradition is alive and well in contemporary Indonesia since it is popular and supported by its people. Certain traditional folk dances have been developed into mass dances with simple but structured steps and movements, such as Poco-poco dance from Minahasa North Sulawesi, and Sajojo dance from Papua.

== Traditions ==
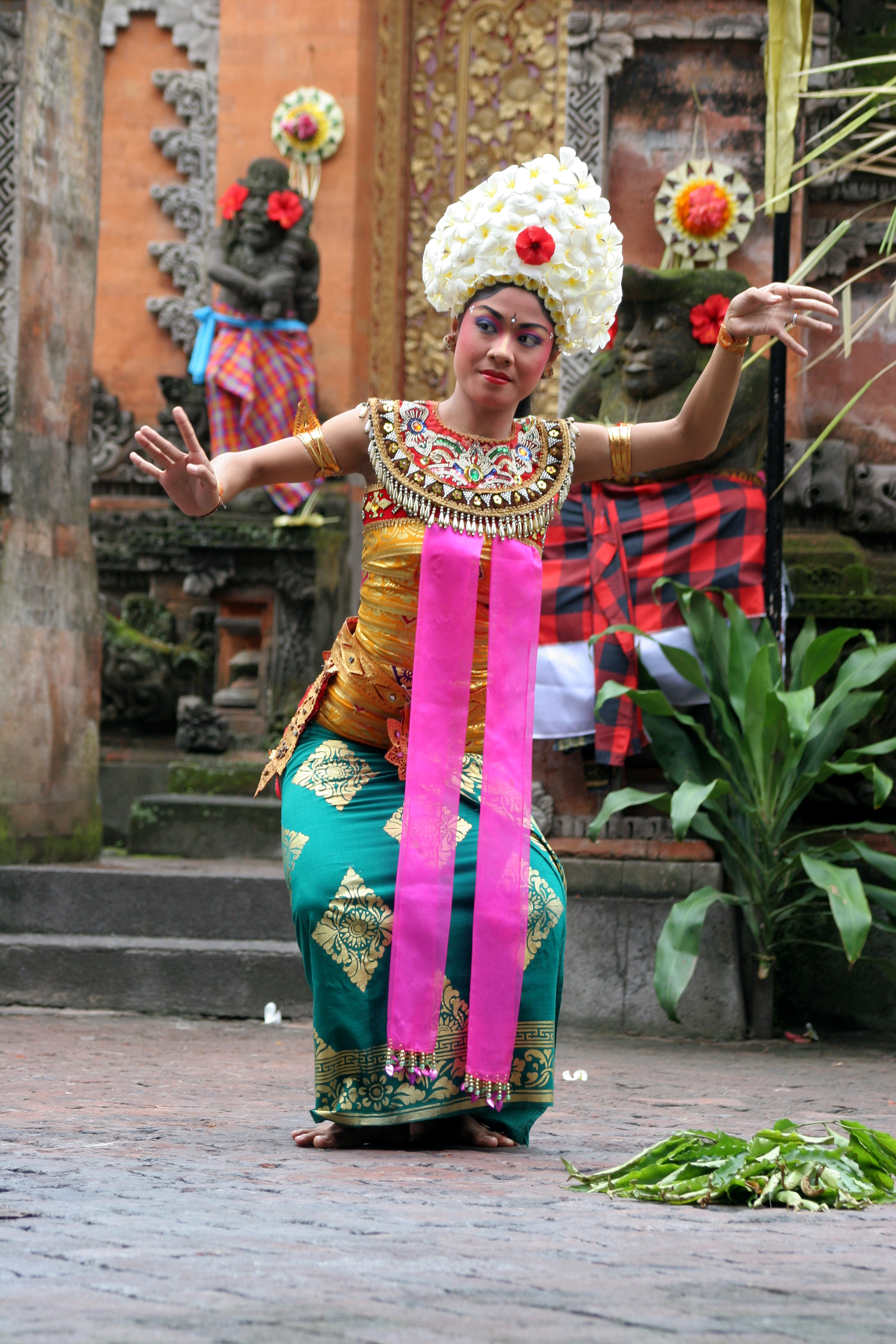
Balinese temple dancer performing Sekar Jepun dance

=== The traditional dance ===
The traditional dance of Indonesia reflects the rich diversity of the Indonesian people. The dance traditions in Indonesia, such as Balinese, Javanese, Sundanese, Minangkabau, Palembang, Malay, Aceh and many other dance traditions are age-old traditions, yet also a living and dynamic traditions. Certain traditional dances might be centuries old, while some others might have been created less than a decade ago. The creation of a new dance choreography but still within the frame of respected dance tradition and discipline is still possible. As the result, there is some kreasi baru (newly created) dances. The newly created dance could be the rediscovery and the revival of lost old traditions or a new interpretation, inspiration and exploration of traditional dances.

The Art Schools in Indonesia such as Sekolah Tinggi Seni Indonesia (STSI) in Bandung, Institut Kesenian Jakarta (IKJ) in Jakarta, Institut Seni Indonesia (ISI/Indonesian Art Institute) in Denpasar, Yogyakarta, and Surakarta all are fostering and encouraging their student to explore the dance traditions in Indonesia. Certain festival such as Bali Art Festival also known as the distinguished event for Balinese traditional dance choreographers to showcase their Balinese kreasi baru dances.

=== The contemporary dance ===
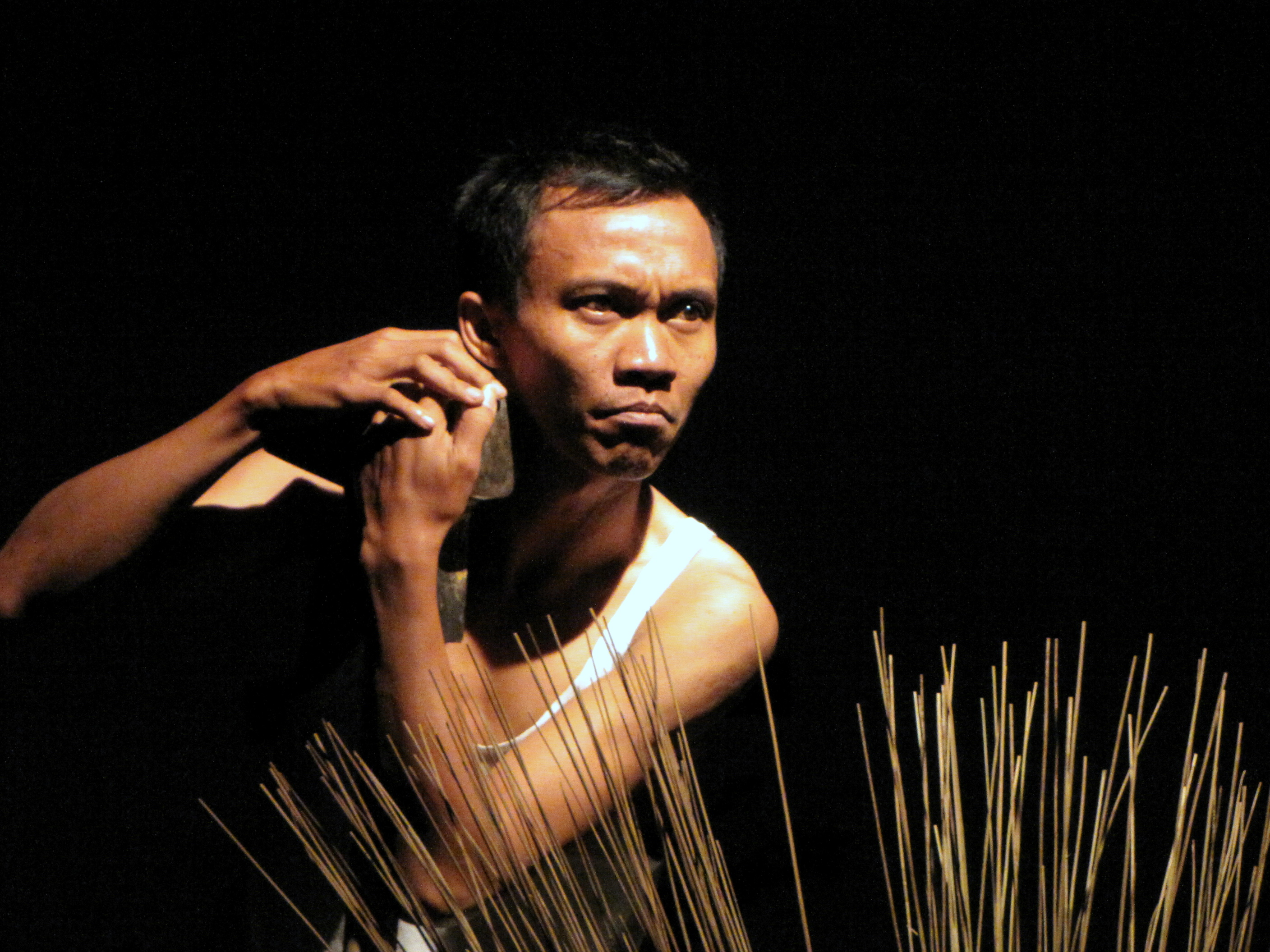
Indonesian contemporary dance involved in a play performance.

Indonesian contemporary dance borrows influences from abroad, such as western ballet and modern dance. In 1954, two artists from Yogyakarta — Bagong Kusudiarjo and Wisnuwardhana — journeyed to the United States to study ballet and modern dance with a number of dance companies. When they returned to Indonesia in 1959 they brought with them a new artistic culture, which changed the face of movement and choreography and introduced the idea of individual expression to Indonesian dance. The idea of dance as individual expression and artistic exploration rejuvenate the tradition-based dance discipline of traditional Indonesia, through exposure to artists from a wide range of cultural and artistic backgrounds. Native traditional dance traditions often influenced the contemporary dance in Indonesia, such as traditional Javanese dance form, pose and poise often took place in contemporary dances performances.

International dance collaborations also possible and often took place, such as the collaboration of Noh Japanese dance with Balinese and Javanese dance theatre. Another example is the collaboration of two dance traditions, between Indonesian Balinese Legong dance and Indian Bharata Natyam. Legong and Bharata Natyam's similarities extend to more than its roots or spirituality. Both are joyful celebrations of life and a shared classical heritage of culture and dance.

Indonesian modern dance also showcased in Indonesian showbiz, such as the dance performance to accompany songs, music performances or entertainment. Today with rapid pop culture influences from abroad, especially United States, urban teen dances such as street dances also gain popularity among Indonesian youngsters.

== List of dances ==
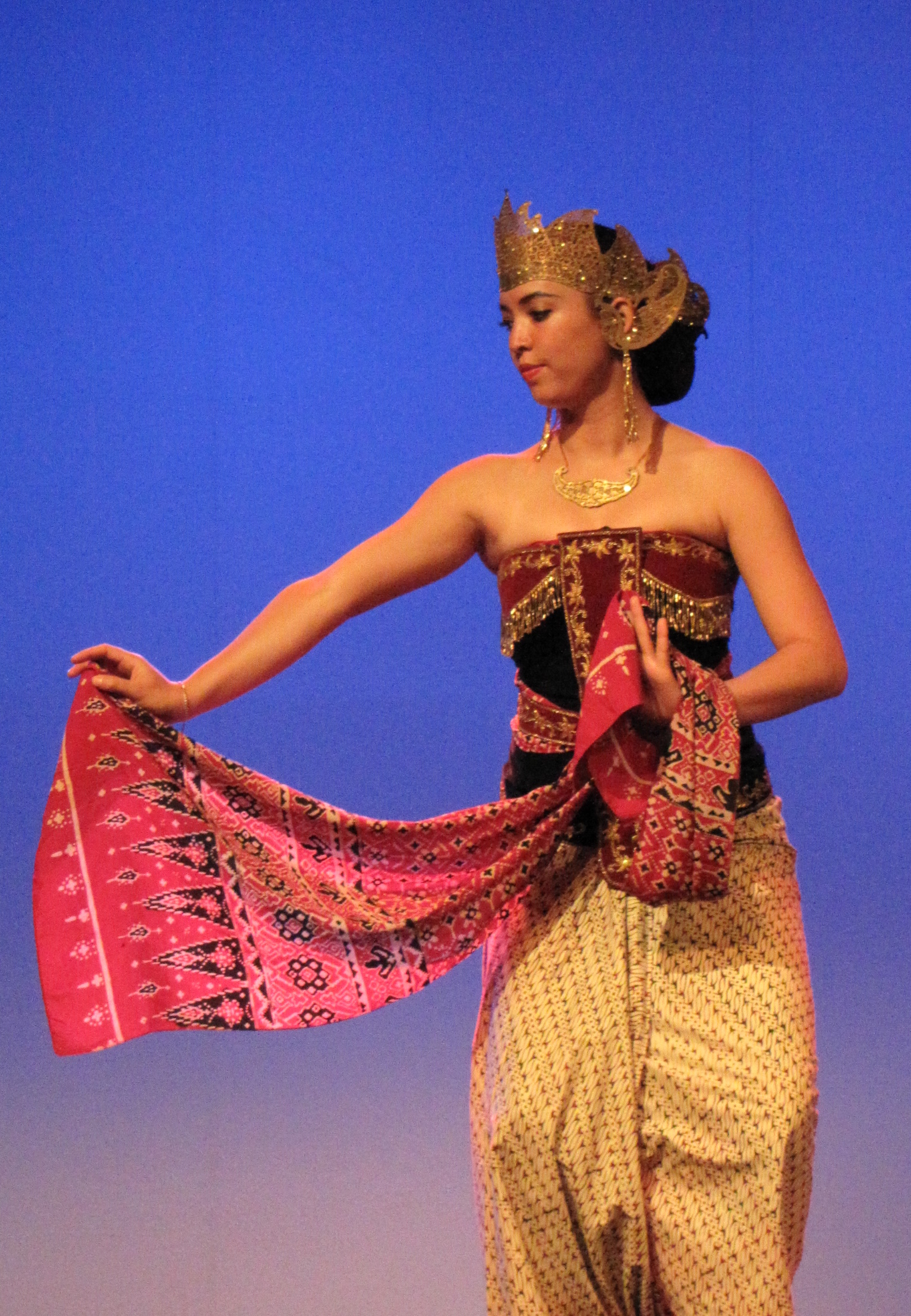
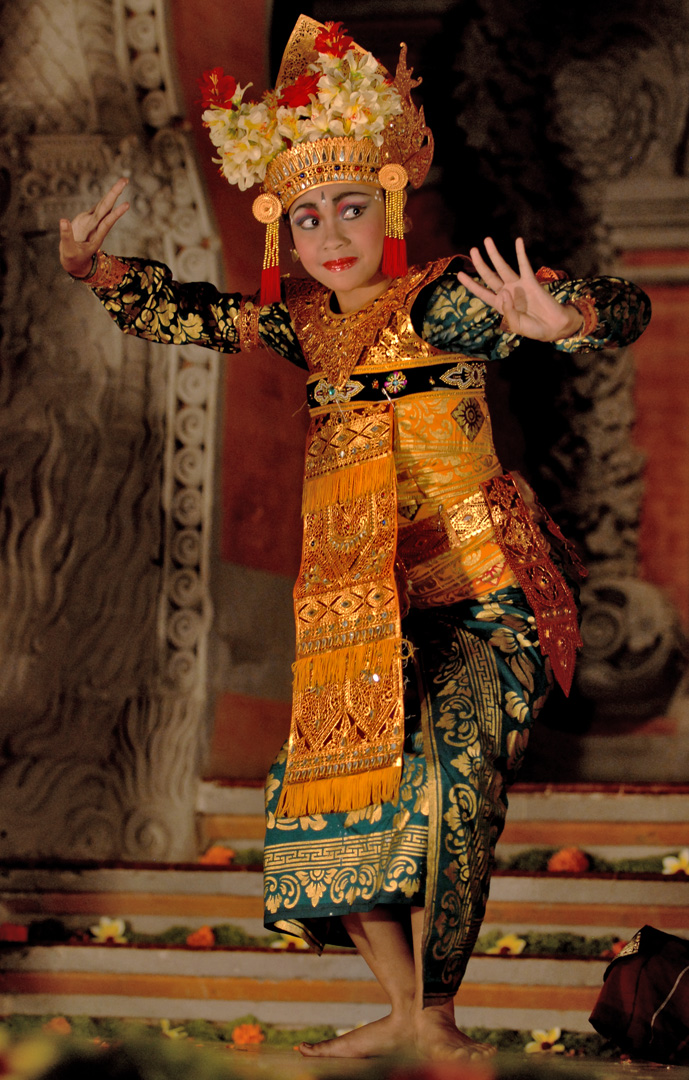
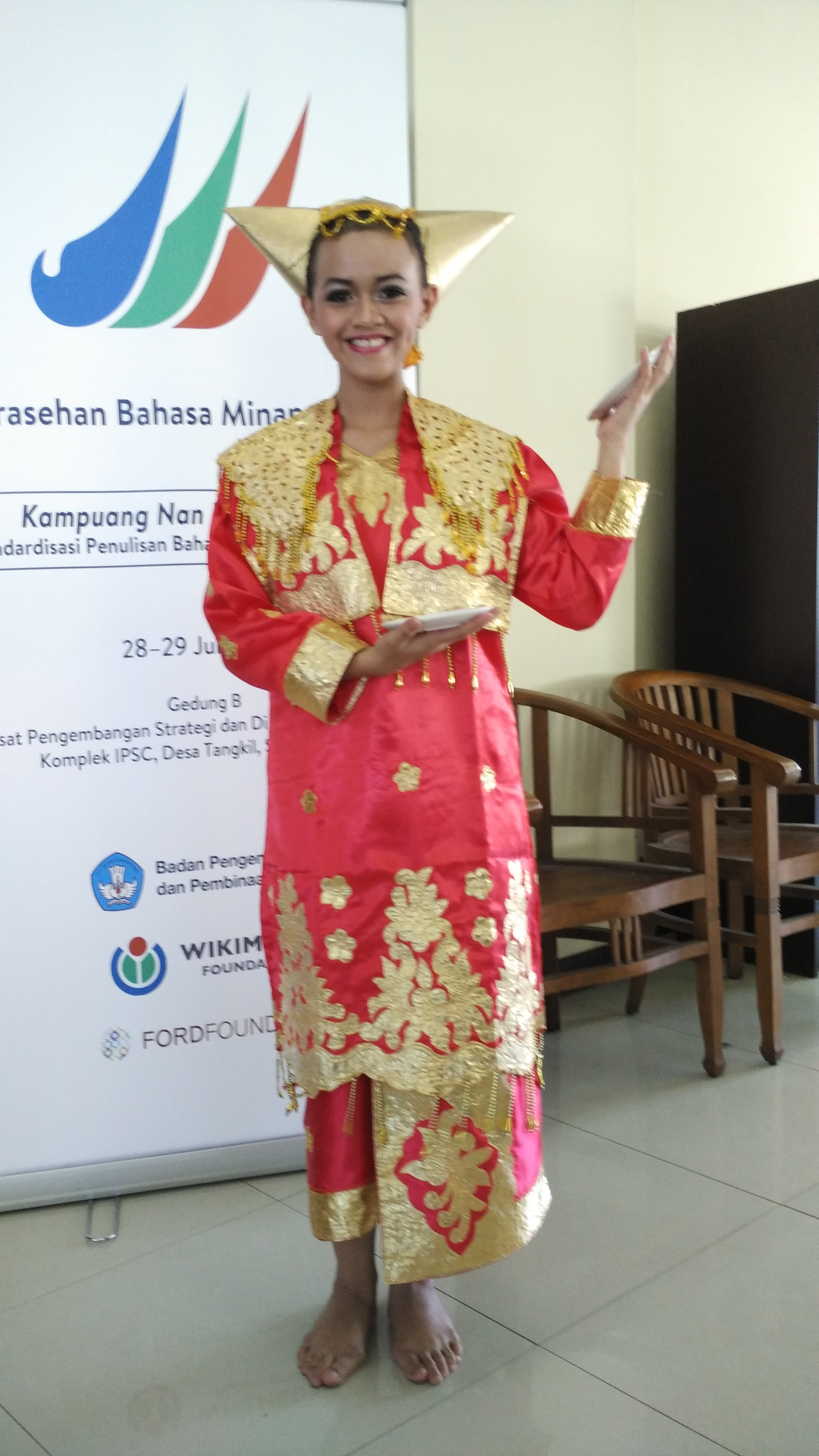
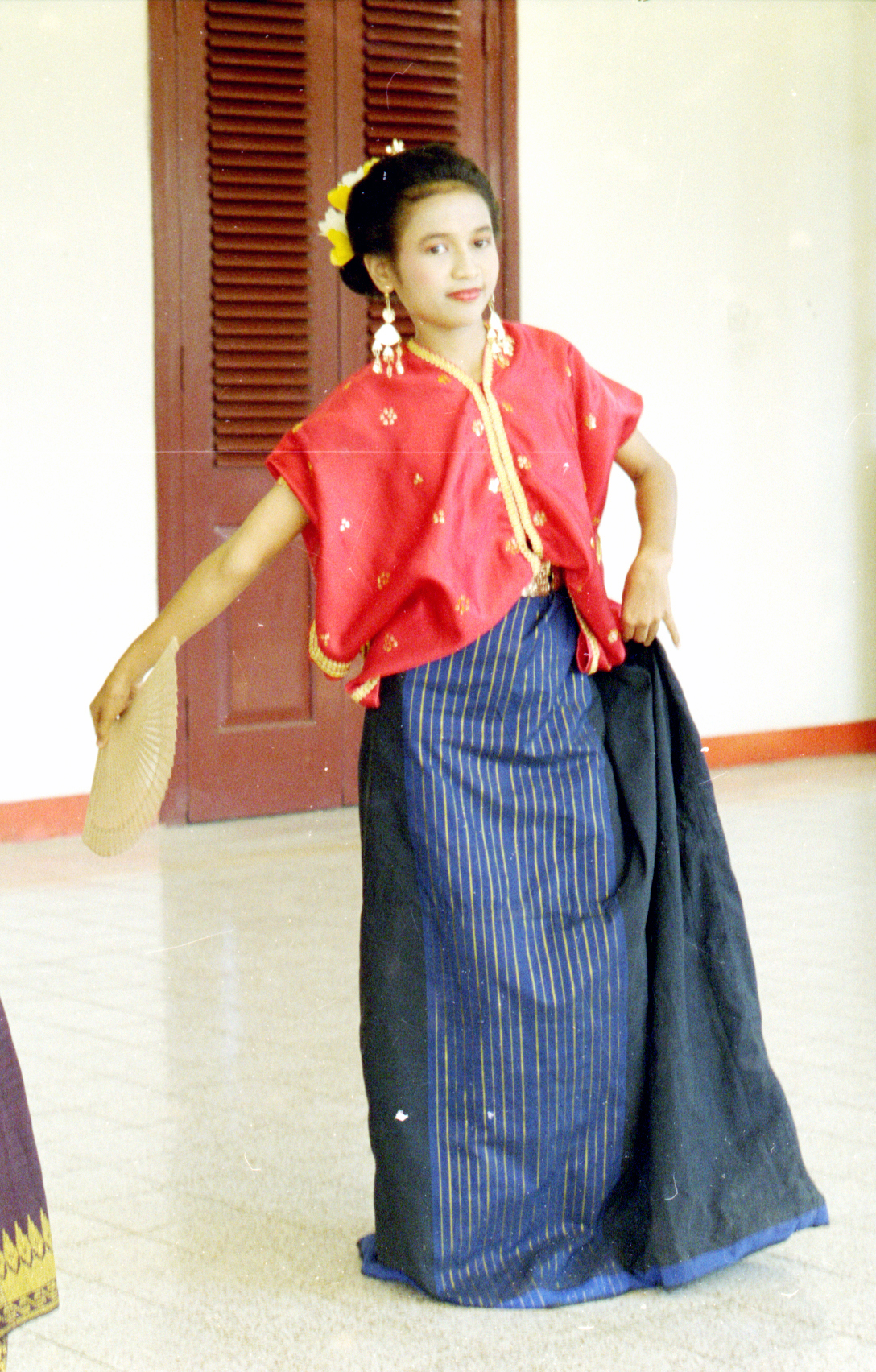
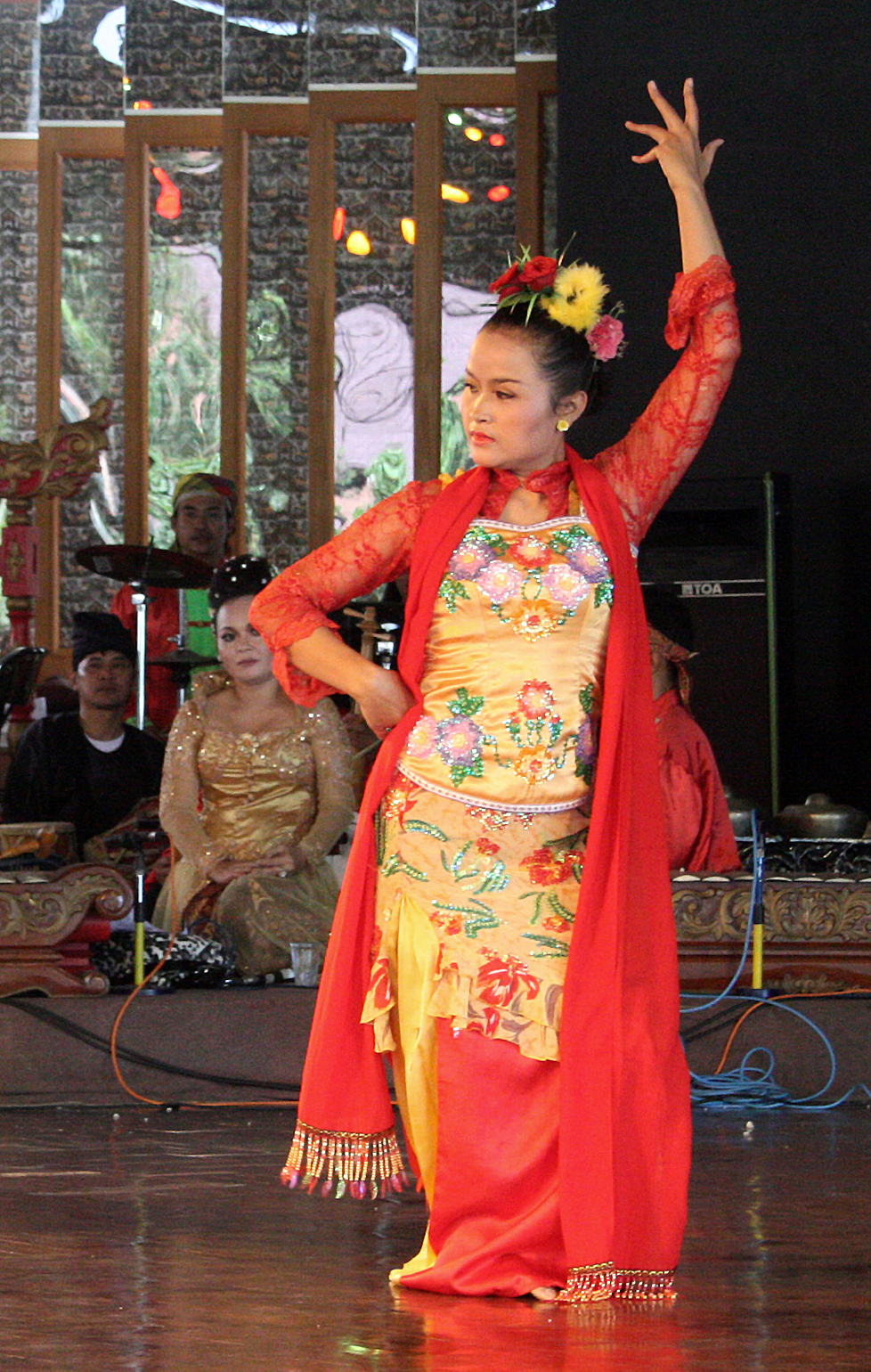
Indonesian dances. From left to right: Serimpi of Java, Legong of Bali, Piring dance of Minangkabau, Pajoge of Bugis, and Jaipongan of Sunda.

=== Balinese ===
- Baris
- Barong
- Cendrawasih
- Condong
- Gambuh
- Janger
- Joged
- Kebyar duduk
- Kecak
- Legong
- Mageret Pandan
- Manuk Rawa
- Oleg
- Panyembrama
- Pendet
- Rejang
- Sanghyang
- Sekar Jepun
- Topeng

=== Javanese ===
- Bambangan cakil
- Bantengan
- Bedhaya
- Gambyong
- Gandrung
- Golek
- Jurit ampil kridha warastra
- Kuda lumping
- Lengger
- Lengger lanang
- Remo
- Reog Ponorogo
- Ronggeng
- Serimpi
- Singo Ulung
- Topeng Ireng
- Topeng Malang
- Wayang gedog
- Wayang wong

=== Sundanese ===
- Bajidor Kahot
- Dewi
- Bangbarongan
- Jaipongan
- Keurseus
- Kupu-kupu
- Merak
- Ratu Graeni
- Kuda Renggong
- Sisingaan
- Badaya Wirahmasari
- Topeng Priangan
- Ratu Graeni
- Arimbi

=== Cirebonese ===
- Topeng Cirebon

=== Betawi ===
- Cokek
- Lenggang Betawi
- Ondel-ondel
- Ronggeng
- Topeng Betawi
- Yapong

=== Acehnese ===
- Didong
- Likok Pulo
- Ranub lam Puan
- Rapai Geleng
- Ratoh Duek
- Ratoh Jaroe
- Rodat
- Saman
- Seudati

=== Batak ===
- Sigale-gale
- Tandok
- Tor-tor

=== Minangkabau ===
- Alang Babega
- Indang
- Lilin
- Pasambahan
- Payung
- Piring
- Randai
- Rantak

=== Palembangese ===
- Gending Sriwijaya
- Kebagh
- Mejeng Basuko
- Pagar pengantin
- Rodat Cempako
- Tanggai

=== Malay ===
- Bangsawan
- Joget Melayu
- Persembahan
- Sekapur Sirih
- Tandak
- Zapin
- Zapin Api

=== Lampung ===
- Melinting

=== Banjarese ===
- Baksa kembang
- Topeng Banjar

=== Dayak ===
- Gantar
- Hudoq
- Kancet Papatai
- Kancet Ledo
- Kancet Lasan
- Kuyang
- Serumpai

=== Minahasan ===
- Kabasaran
- Maengket
- Poco-poco

=== Torajan ===
- Ma'badong

=== Buginese–Makassarese ===
- Gandrang Bulo
- Paduppa
- Pajoge
- Pakarena
- Paraga
- Pepe-Pepeka ri Makka

=== Sasak and Timorese ===
- Rudat
- Tebe

=== Moluccan and Papuan ===
- Cakalele
- Sajojo

=== Chinese ===
- Barongsai
- Liang Liong

== See also ==
- Javanese dance
- Balinese dance
- Sundanese dance
- Culture of Indonesia

== Sources ==
- Ananta, Aris; Arifin, Evi Nurvidya; Hasbullah, M Sairi; Handayani, Nur Budi; Pramono, Agus (2015). Demography of Indonesia's Ethnicity. Institute of Southeast Asian Studies. ISBN 978-981-4519-87-8.
