= Tebe dance =

Indonesian traditional dance

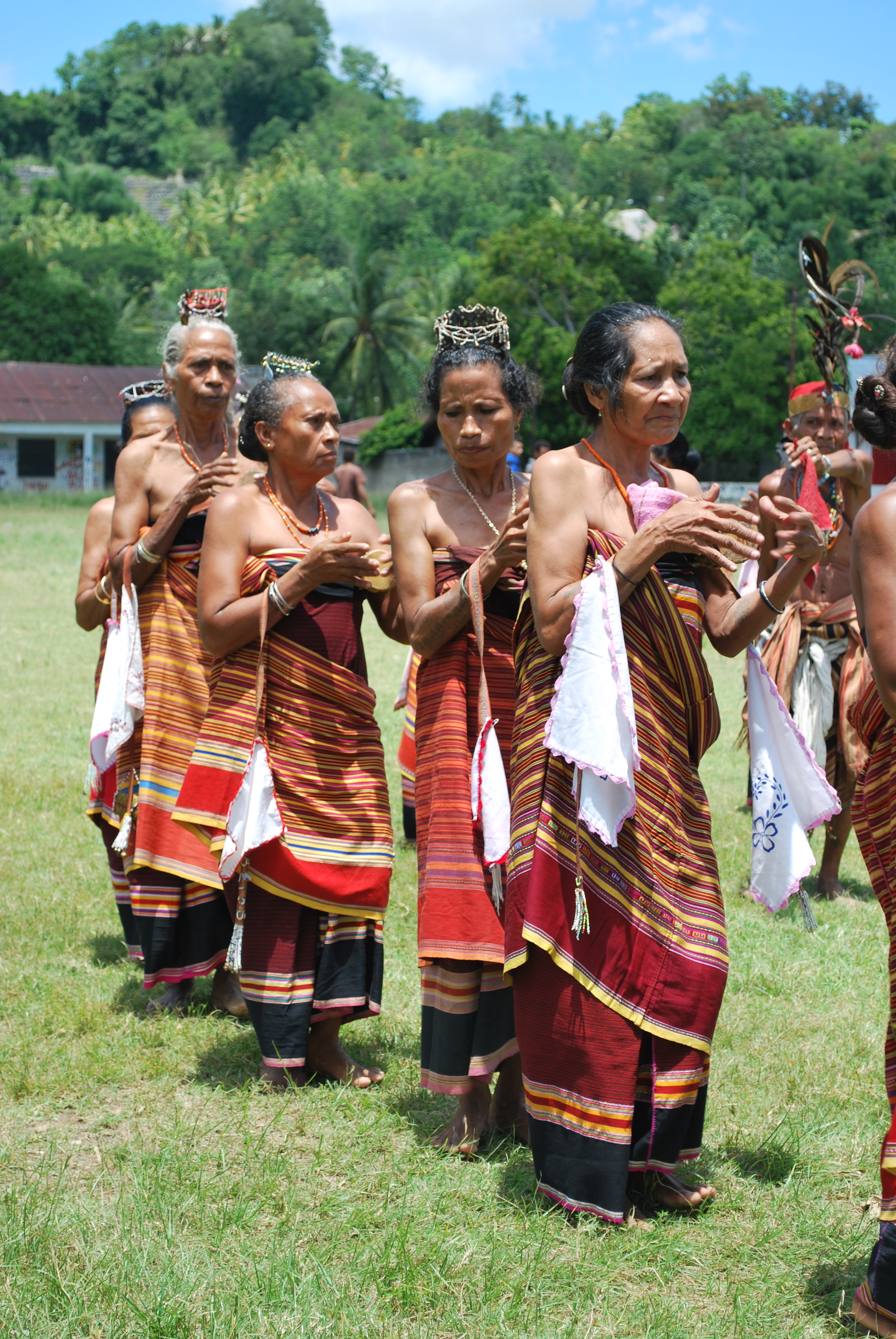
- Tebe traditional dance performance by female dancers in Viqueque, Timor-Leste
- Genre: Traditional dance
- Instrument(s): Kendhang, Kompang
- Origin: Indonesia

Tebe dance is a traditional dance originating from East Nusa Tenggara, Indonesia and East Timor. Tebe dance is a typical dance of the Belu and Malaka people, and it symbolizes the intimacy and solidarity between residents. In addition, Tebe dance is also an overflow of joy for success or victory.

The Tebe dance is performed by men and women holding hands while singing in unison poems and rhymes that contain praise, criticism or requests, while stomping their feet according to the rhythm of the song. The Tebe dance ends when all the performers sit cross-legged on a large mat to share a light meal together as a sign to part ways and return to their homes.

The Tebe dance, which is one of the cultures of East Nusa Tenggara, is usually performed at night, during traditional weddings or other events. According to historical records, in ancient times it was carried out when the Meo (war soldier) returned from the battlefield carrying the enemy's head, then staked it in the middle and then surrounded it all night, and usually for 3 or 4 days.

The Tebe Dance is often performed at church events or other joyful events. It is also performed in Timor-Leste, where it is known as Tebe-tebe.

== Gallery ==
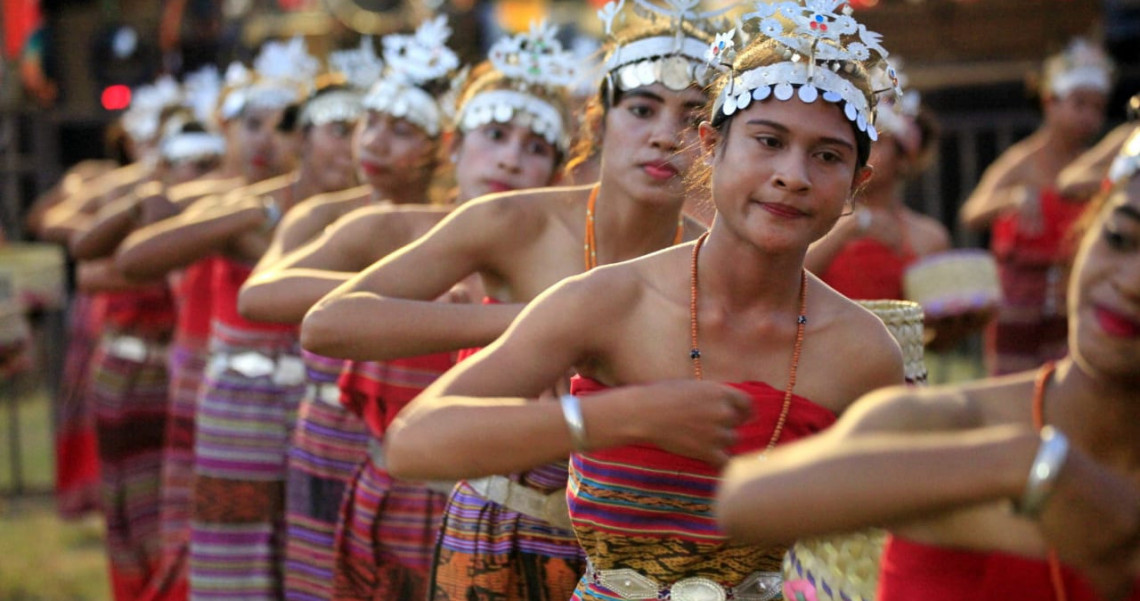
Tebe dancers wearing traditional clothes

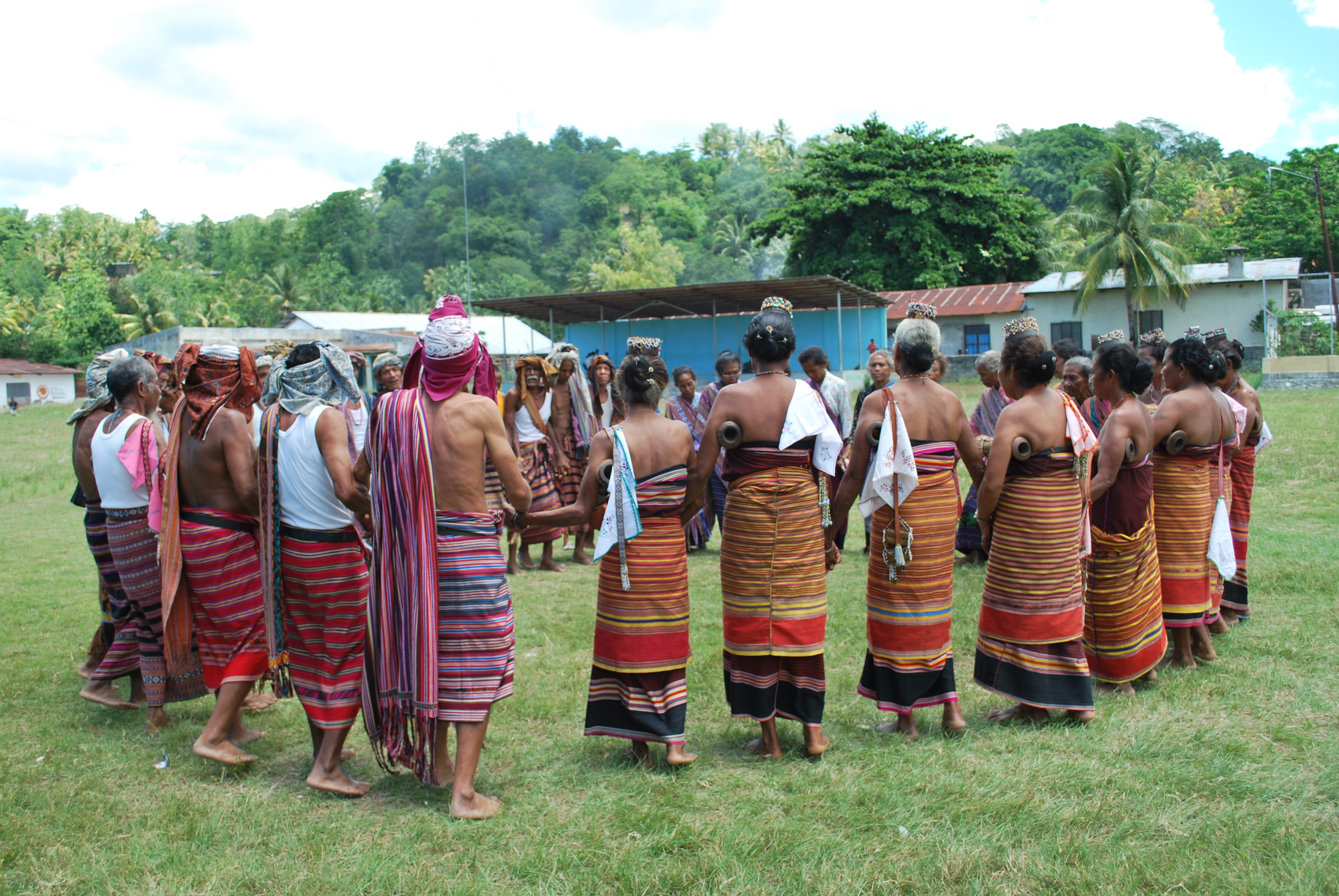
Tebe dancers make a circle in dancing

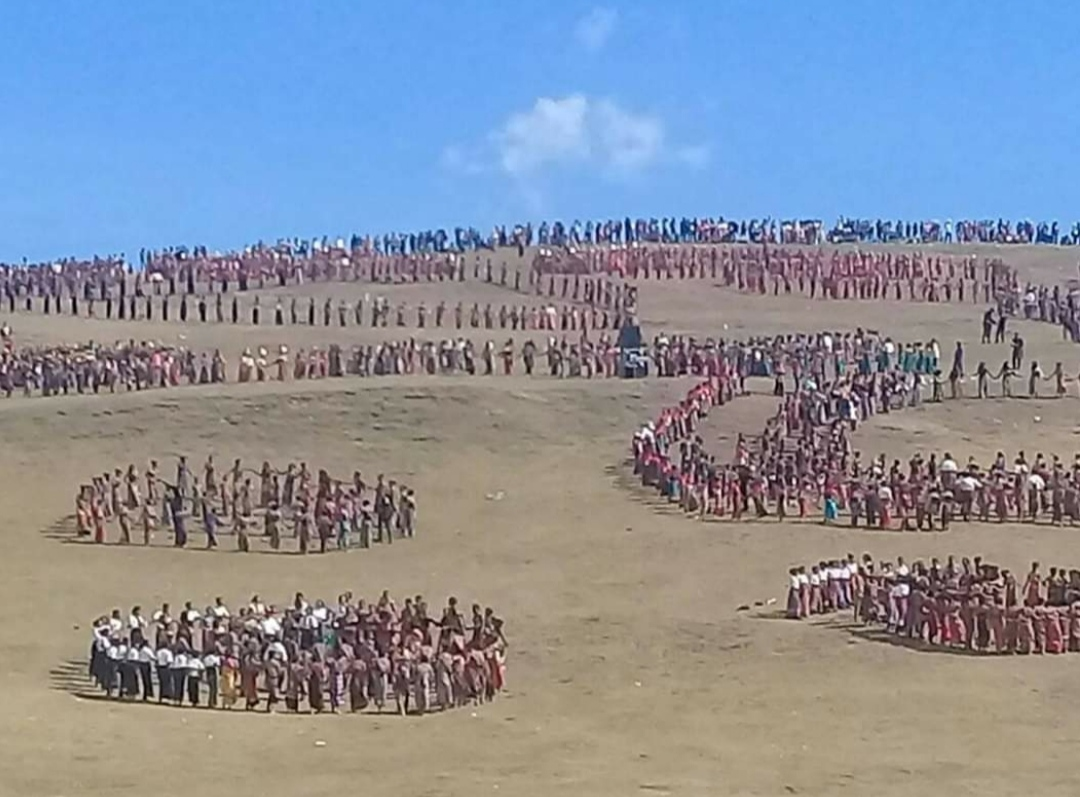
Tebe dancers line up and make a circle in a group

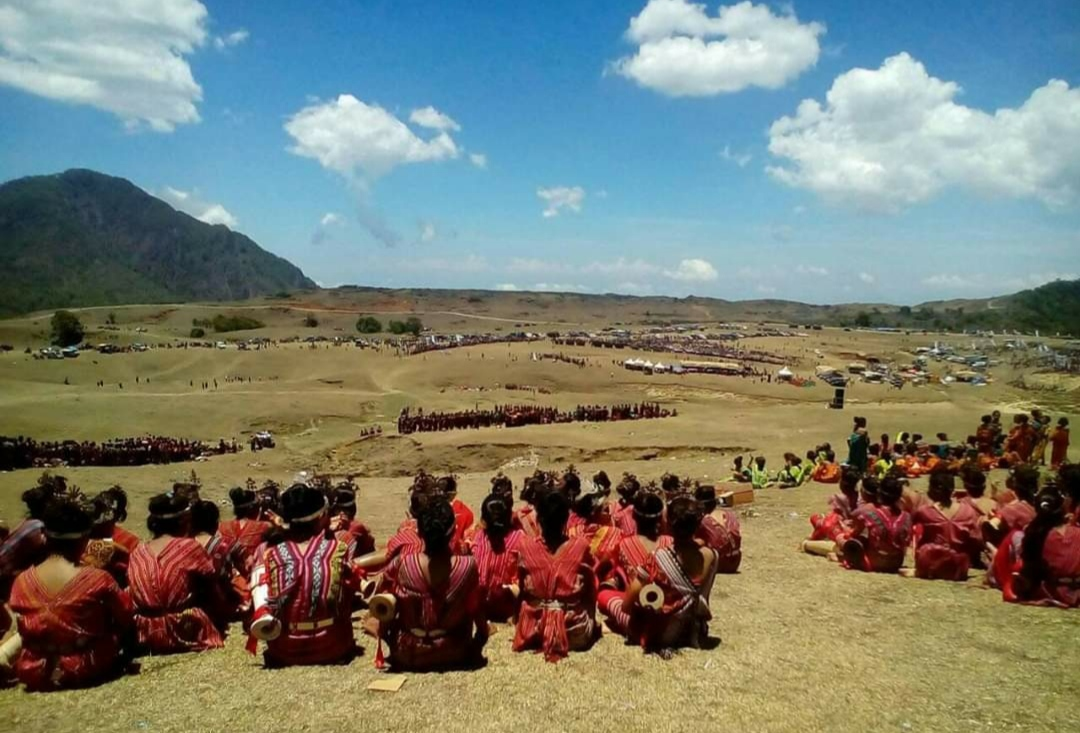
The closing of the Tebe dance is marked by sitting cross-legged

== See also ==
- Rejang dance
- Yapong dance
- Dance in Indonesia
