= Jurit Ampil Kridha Warastra =

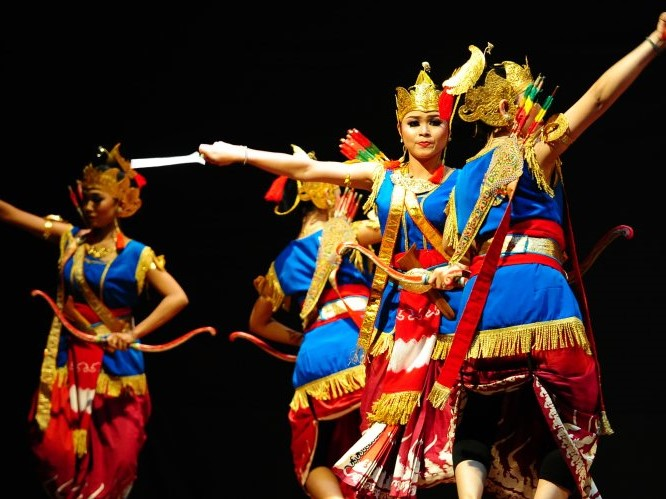
Jurit Ampil Kridha Warastra.

Jurit Ampil Kridha Warastra (Javanese: ꦧꦼꦏ꧀ꦱꦤ꧀ꦗꦸꦫꦶꦠ꧀ꦲꦩ꧀ꦥꦶꦭ꧀ꦏꦿꦶꦣꦮꦫꦱ꧀ꦠꦿ, romanized: Beksan Jurit Ampil Kridha Warastra) is a classical dance originating from Salatiga, Central Java Province, Indonesia. This dance depicts the female troops of garwa ampil (concubines) of Mangkunegara I, also known as Raden Mas Said (Pangeran Samber Nyawa), in the context of the Salatiga Treaty. It is classified as a free-style dance, meaning it can be performed in groups, pairs, or solo. The classical elements of the dance are reflected in its movements, accompanying music, costumes, and makeup. However, these traditional aspects have been blended with modern elements to adapt to contemporary trends.

== History dan elements ==
This dance conveys significant notions: jurit translates to "soldier", garwa ampil refers to "concubine" (of Mangkunegara I), and warastra means "bow and arrow". In general, the dance depicts the troops of Mangkunegara I's concubines during the Salatiga Treaty, (Note: The Salatiga Treaty marked an effort to resolve a power struggle that ended the Mataram Sultanate. As part of the agreement, Hamengkubuwana I and Pakubuwana III ceded some of their territories to Mangkunegara I.) enacted on 17 March 1757. The treaty involved Hamengkubuwana I, Pakubuwana III, and Mangkunegara I, each showcasing their military strength during the event. Mangkunegara I displayed several bregada (military units), one of which was Jurit Ampil, consisting of female soldiers drawn from his concubines.

This dance belongs to the free-style category, allowing performances in groups, pairs, or solo. Its classical essence is evident in its movements, music, costumes, and makeup, although modern elements have been incorporated to adapt to changing times. The dance also blends classical Surakarta-style dance and folk dance, incorporating many movements from the Prajuritan dance. The accompanying music uses Javanese gamelan in the pelog scale, including instruments such as gender, kendhang, demung, saron, kenong, kempul, and gong, while the musical compositions feature lancaran, srepeg, and palaran.

The dancers wear a female warrior costume, with their hair styled in a small bun adorned with a golden crown. The main attire consists of a short-sleeved blue shirt with gold embellishments, a belt, and a dodot, paired with knee-length trousers. The weapons include jemparing (bow and arrow), endhong (quiver), nyenyep (arrow), gendewa (bow), and cundrik (dagger). The makeup serves to enhance the character and expression of a soldier's persona.

== See also ==
- Dance in Indonesia
- Javanese dance
