= Pajoge =

Indonesian traditional dance

Pajoge dance
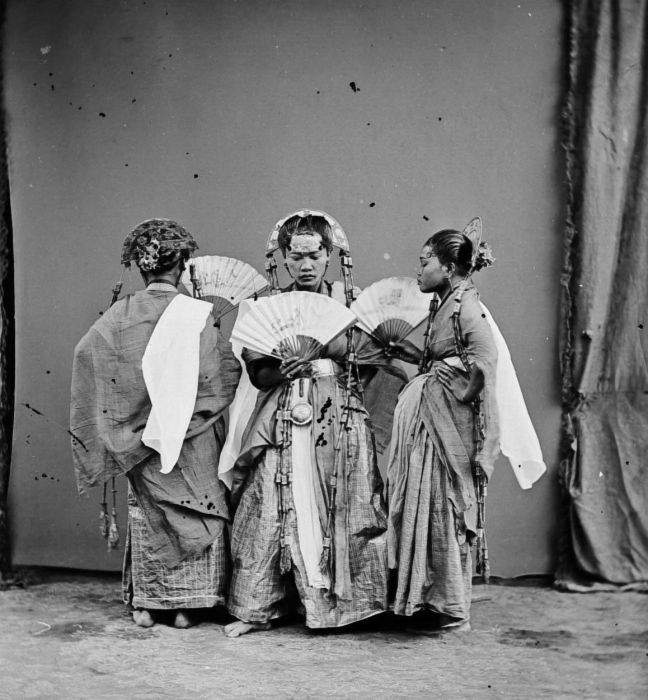
- Pajoge dancers with traditional costumes in 1870
- Genre: Court dance
- Instrument(s): Kendhang, Gong
- Inventor: Bugis and Makassarese
- Origin: Indonesia

Pajoge dance is a traditional Bugis and Makassar dance originating from Bone, South Sulawesi, Indonesia. The term Pajoge has three meanings at once. From the word joge which means a 'dance', the word pa and joge refers to 'dancers', as well as a 'performance'.

Based on the dancers, Pajoge dance is divided into two, namely Pajoge Makkunrai and Pajoge Angkong. Pajoge Makkunrai is performed by girls, while Pajoge Angkong is performed by transgender dancers. Between both, Pajoge Makkunrai is more developed and more staged to date. Pajoge Makkunrai developed around the Kingdom of Bone, Wajoq, Soppeng, and Barru.

== Form and movement ==
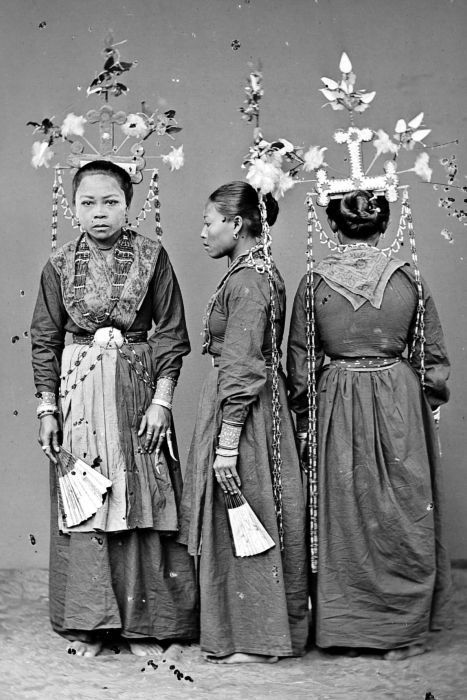
Pajoge dancer clothes, with various ornaments, circa 1870

The pajoge dancing girl is appointed and chosen by the royal family. Usually the criteria for dancers are unmarried girls who are able to sing or (makkelong), have a beautiful appearance (magello-gello), behave well (ampe-ampe madeceng), and have good posture (malebu-lebu/mabondeng). The number of dancers is usually 4, 8, 10, 12 people or an even number.

The dancers will wear bodo clothes, with their hair styled in a bun or sibollo flower symbol. They also wear a triangular crown, or jungge that is hanging down near the hips. Behind the jungge, there is a rocking betel nut or rocking flower decoration. Meanwhile, the mandatory property that dancers bring is a fan or papi.

The musical instruments that accompany the Pajoge Dance are drums and gongs. Pajoge dance consists of 20 titles of poetry which means advice or advice. Some of the poems that are still known today are the songs of Allah-Allah and Ininnawa Sabbaraki.

== Performance ==
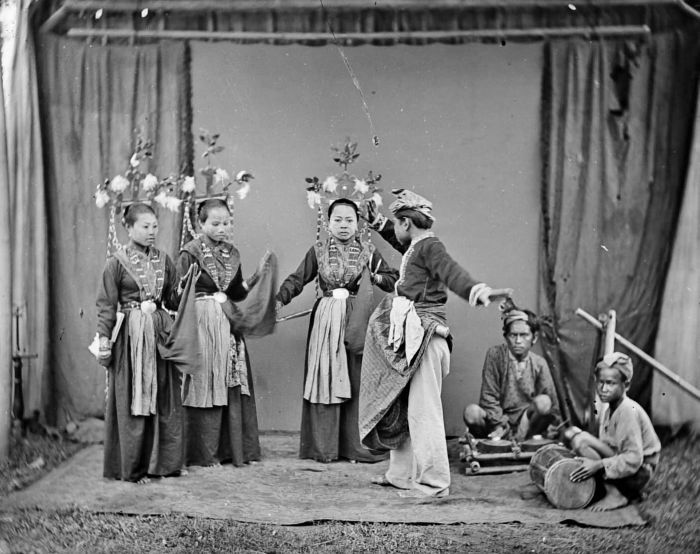
Pajoge dancers and musicians in Sulawesi, circa 1870

In the past, the Pajoge Makkunrai was only performed at the royal palace. The dancers are ordinary girls. The male audience will form a circle. While the dancing girl will dance in the middle of the circle.

Dancers will go around in a circle, while dancing and singing. Then the dancer will look for his partner in the audience. If you have chosen, the dancer will give a betel leaf to one of the men and the man will dance with the dancing girl. The chosen man will also give a gift in the form of pears or mappasompe.

However, not all male audience members can dance with the Pajoge dancers. Those who are allowed are only nobles or respected figures. If the man is interested in one of the Pajoge dancers, then the person concerned can express it to the pangibing. Pangibing is a term for the guide in this traditional dance. Furthermore, the Pajoge dancers will be guided by the pangibing. Besides functioning as entertainment, Pajoge Makkunrai Dance is also used as a medium to bring people closer to their king.

The performance will be opened and closed by Indo pajoge or the lead dancer. Therefore, he must always be ready next to a kendhang or paganrang player. The show begins when Indo pajoge sings (massita elong), then the singing is continued by other dancers. They also chant together in a standing position (tettong mabborong).

Pajoge Makkunrai dance movements include the tettong mabborong (gathering together), mappakaraja (respect), mappasompe (giving gifts), ballung, mappacanda (rejoicing), matteka (crossing), massessere (surrounding), majjulekkalebba (stepping wide), mattappo (spreading ), maggalio (bend body), mappaleppa (clapping hands), and massimang (goodbye).

The main movement that gets the attention of the audience is the ballung movement, where the dancer will lie down near the audience who will do mappasompe (giving gift). This movement will be escorted by pangibing. Previously, pangibing brought a betel leaf and handed it to the audience who had expressed their interest in the Pajoge dancers. Currently Pajoge Dance is usually held at weddings, welcoming guests and important government activities.

== See also ==
- Gandrung
- Lengger lanang
- Dance in Indonesia
