= Fire performance (Indonesia) =

Indonesian traditional dance

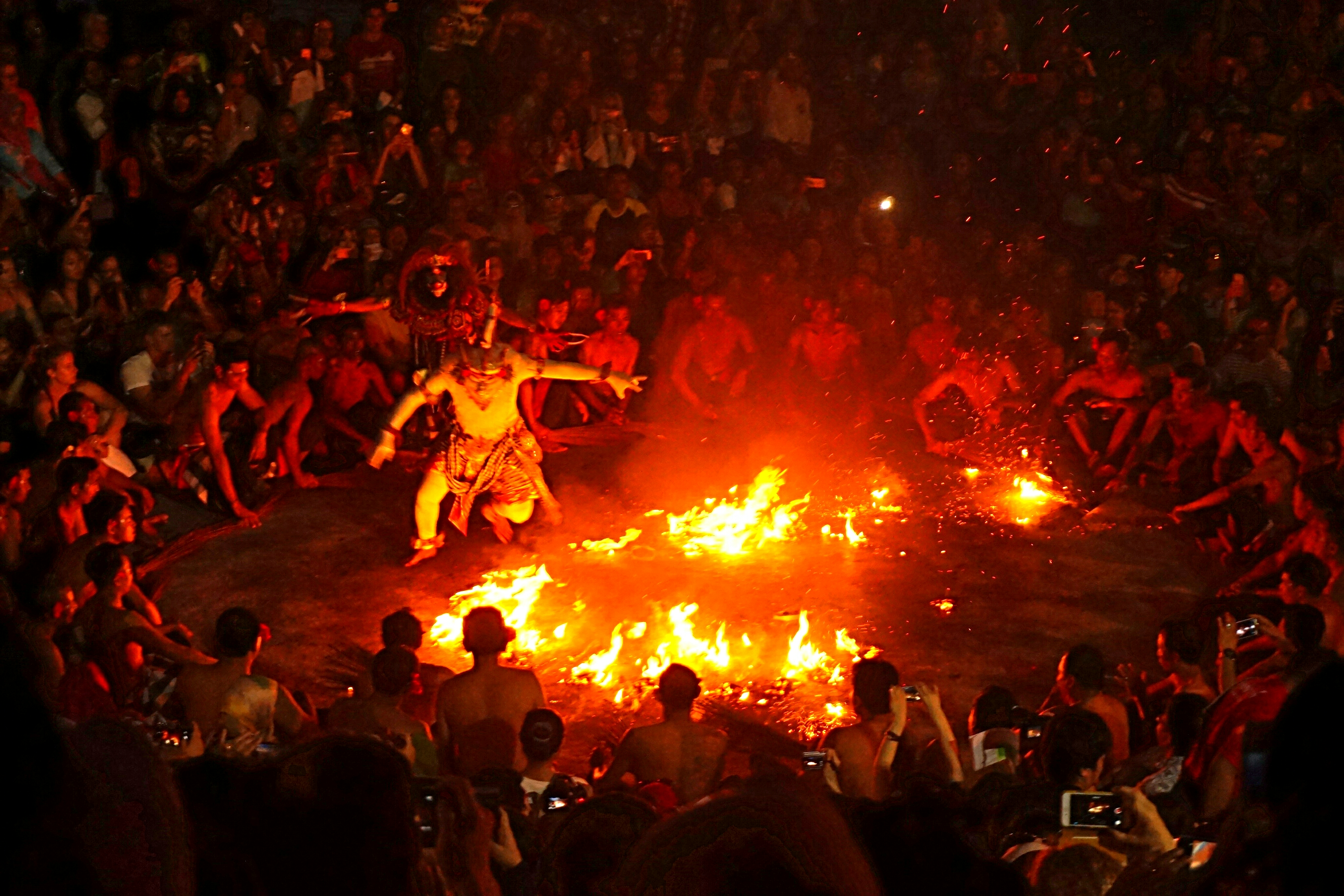
Kecak dance performance with fire in Bali, Indonesia

In Indonesia, a fire performance (Indonesian: Pertunjukan Api) is a group of performance arts or skills that involve the manipulation of fire. It includes using fire as a finale in an otherwise non-fire performance. Performances can be done as choreographed routines to music (this type being related to dance).

Fire performance reflects Indonesia's diversity of ethnicities and cultures. There are more than 1,300 ethnic groups in Indonesia, each with its own performances.

== Variations ==
=== Pepe-Pepeka ri Makka ===
Pepe'-pepeka ri Makka is a traditional Makassar fire dance originating from South Sulawesi. The dance's name reveals its connection to Islam, which spread to the communities of South Sulawesi in the 17th century—pepe means 'fire', ri means 'in', and Makka means 'Mecca' (symbolic of Islam in general). This definition can refer to the song lyrics performed by the dancer. The sung verses that accompany pepe'-pepeka ri Makka are believed to be the source of the dancers' strength. The dance's motion and poetry illustrate the story of Ibrahim (Abraham) who, by Allah's will, made peace with fire.

=== Candle dance ===
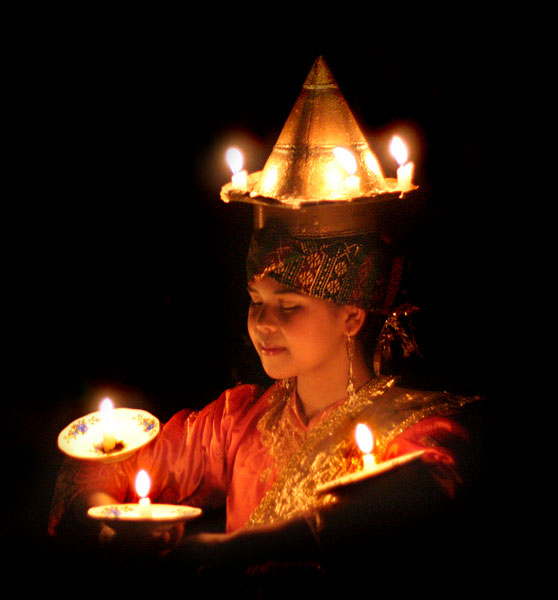
Candle dancers in Padang

The candle dance (Indonesian: Tari Lilin, Minangkabau: Tarian Lilin) is a dance originating from West Sumatra. It is performed by a group of dancers accompanied by a group of musicians. The dancers carry burning candles on plates while performing graceful movements that emphasize the dancer's elegance in the sparkling candlelight but do not let the candles fall or drip wax. The dance requires little movement, but full concentration.

This dance contains drama and stories; for example, it can evoke the atmosphere of a group of village girls helping their friend to find a missing engagement ring.

=== Zapin Api ===
Zapin Api (lit. 'zapin of fire'; Jawi: زاڤين اڤي) is a firedance technique of the classical Malay zapin founded in Rupat, Riau, Indonesia. Legend says that Rupat was cursed under a series of catastrophes in the 1500s and a harmonious balance between all of the elements was needed to restore peace in the area. This led the islanders, under the leadership of Panglima Sage Dagendang, to seek the assistance from the Pawang Besar (Great Mystique) of four natural elements: earth, fire, wind, and water. The mystique agreed to their request and summoned the jinns (spirits) from each respective elements for reconciliation. All of the jinns accepted the invitation to meet with the mystique, except the fire spirit, who demanded that he would arrive only if a special celebration would be held for him. The fire spirit sets the rules for the performance—including its use of fire and the mantra that the mortals should abide by during the performance—thus creating the Zapin Api.

The performance has several strict rituals that must be adhered to by participants and spectators. All the dancers, musicians, and instruments are required to bathe in sacred water and smoked by mantras a few days before the performance. The performance begins with participants reciting prayers and burning incense. Then, the leader recites mantras with a Malay orchestra in the background to summon the spirits. Dancers accompany the orchestra, slowly adapting a spellbound position and drawn directly into the fire.

=== Sanghyang ===
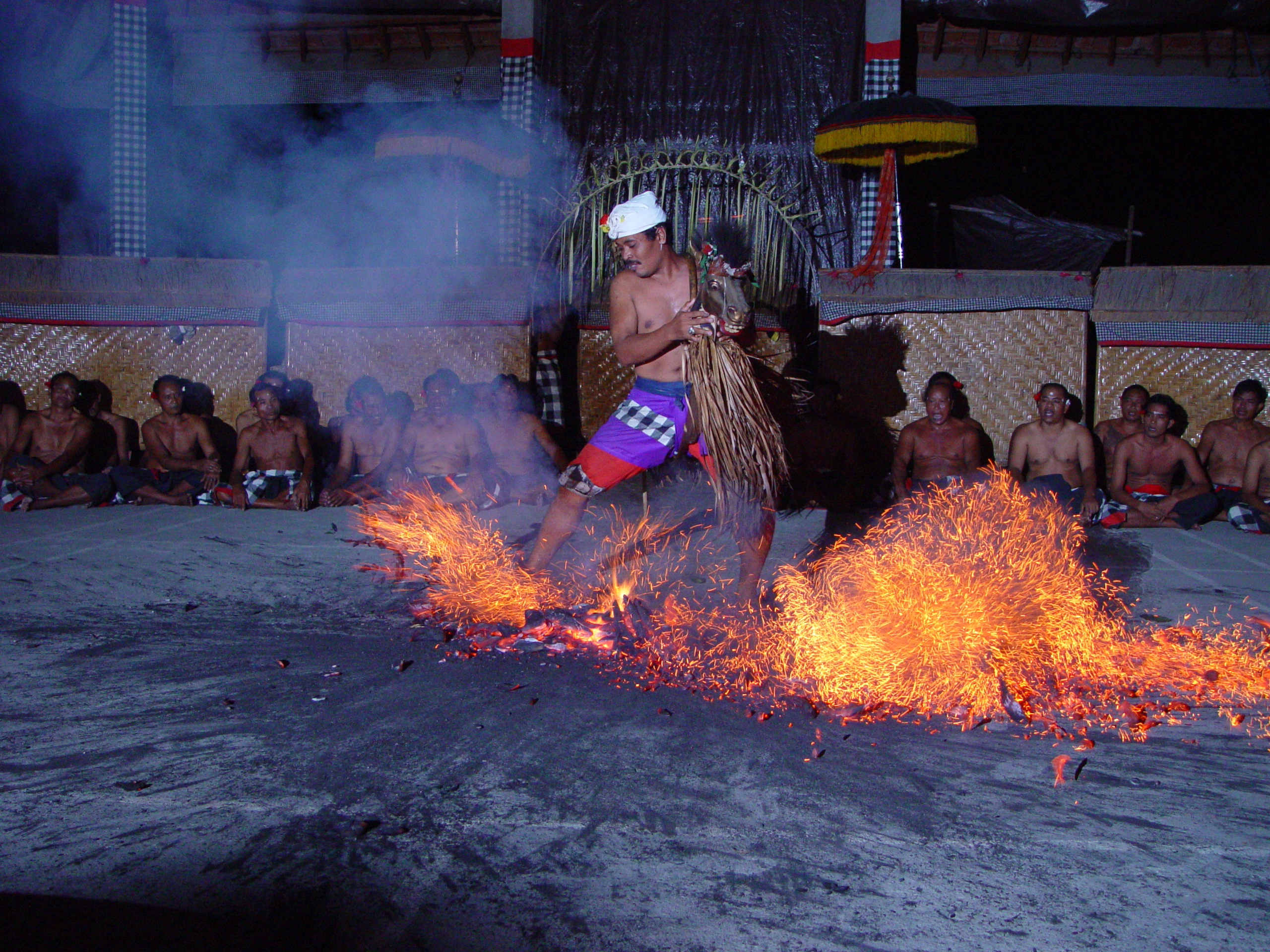
Sanghyang dance performance

Sanghyang is a sacred pre-Hindu dance from Bali which aims to ward off evil. Sanghyang is a dance of spiritual communication between humans and the supernatural by singing songs of praise to the accompaniment of beats. In this dance there are always three important elements; api (fire), gending sanghyang, and dancers. Common sanghyang dances include Sanghyang Dedari, Sanghyang Deling, Sanghyang Bojog, Sanghyang Jaran, Sanghyang Sampat, and Sanghyang Bojog.

=== Kecak ===
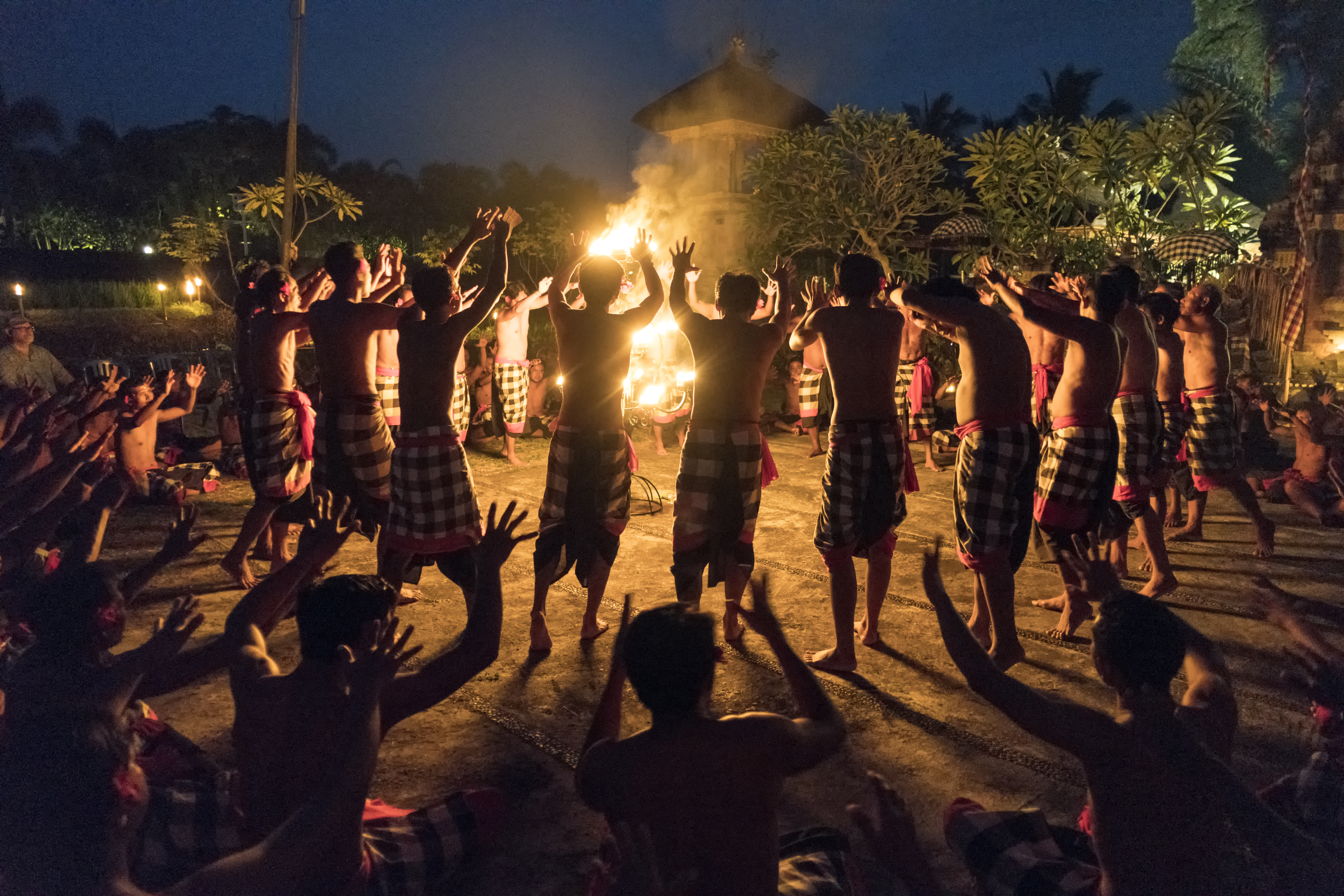
Kecak dance in Bali

Kecak is a form of Balinese Hindu dance and music drama which depicts a battle story from the Hindu epic Ramayana. Kecak is typically performed by about fifty to one hundred men arranged in concentric circles, and whose rhythmic chanting and movement quickens during the performance. Trance rituals often accompany certain sections of the kecak dance, such as during the portrayal of the burning of Hanuman. Here, the dancer playing Hanuman is blessed by a priest and enters a trance state for the 'fire kicking dance' which follows. The dancer does not feel any pain from the fire because he is in a state of trance.

== Gallery ==
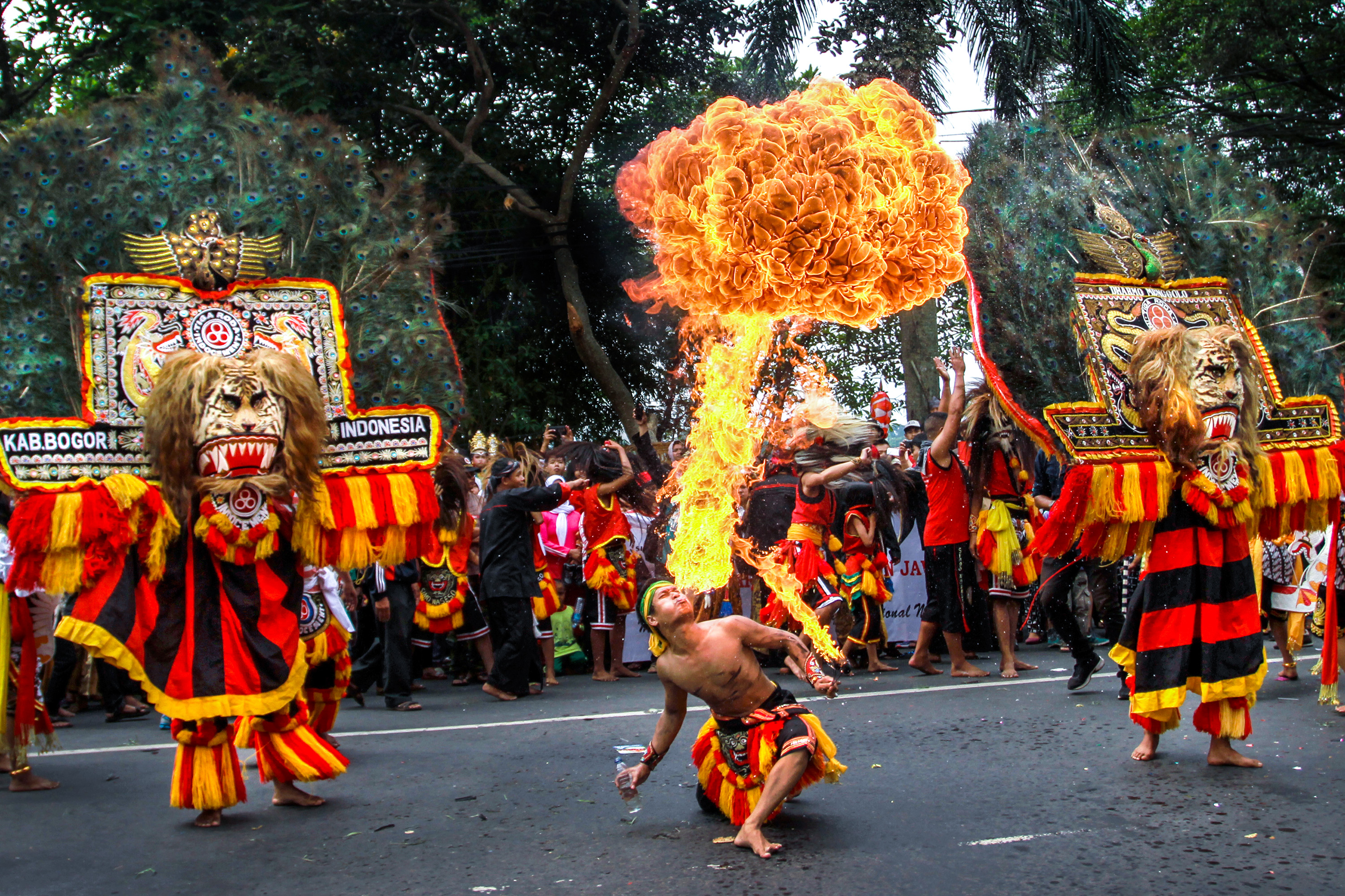
Reog fire dance

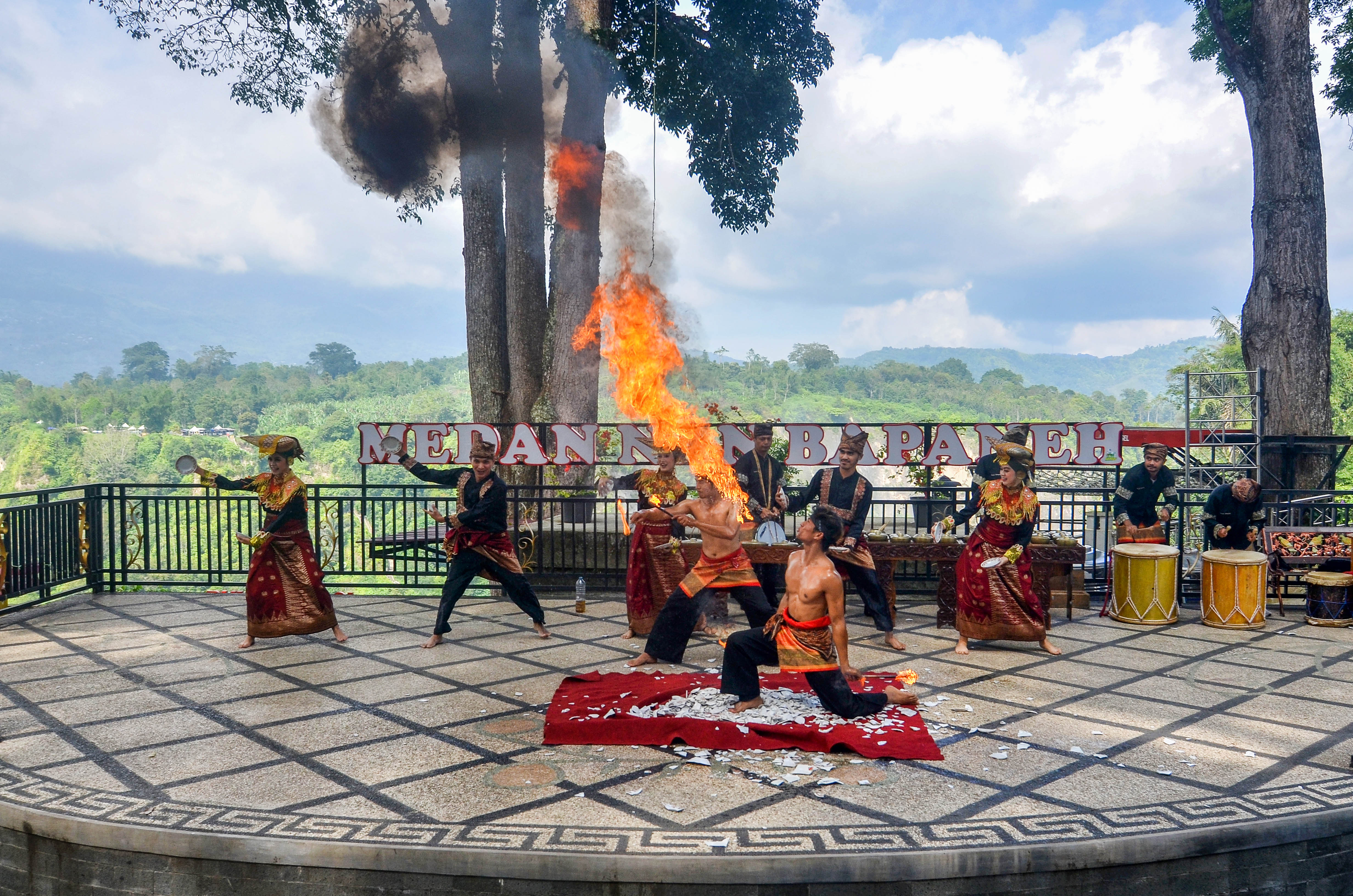
Piring fire dance

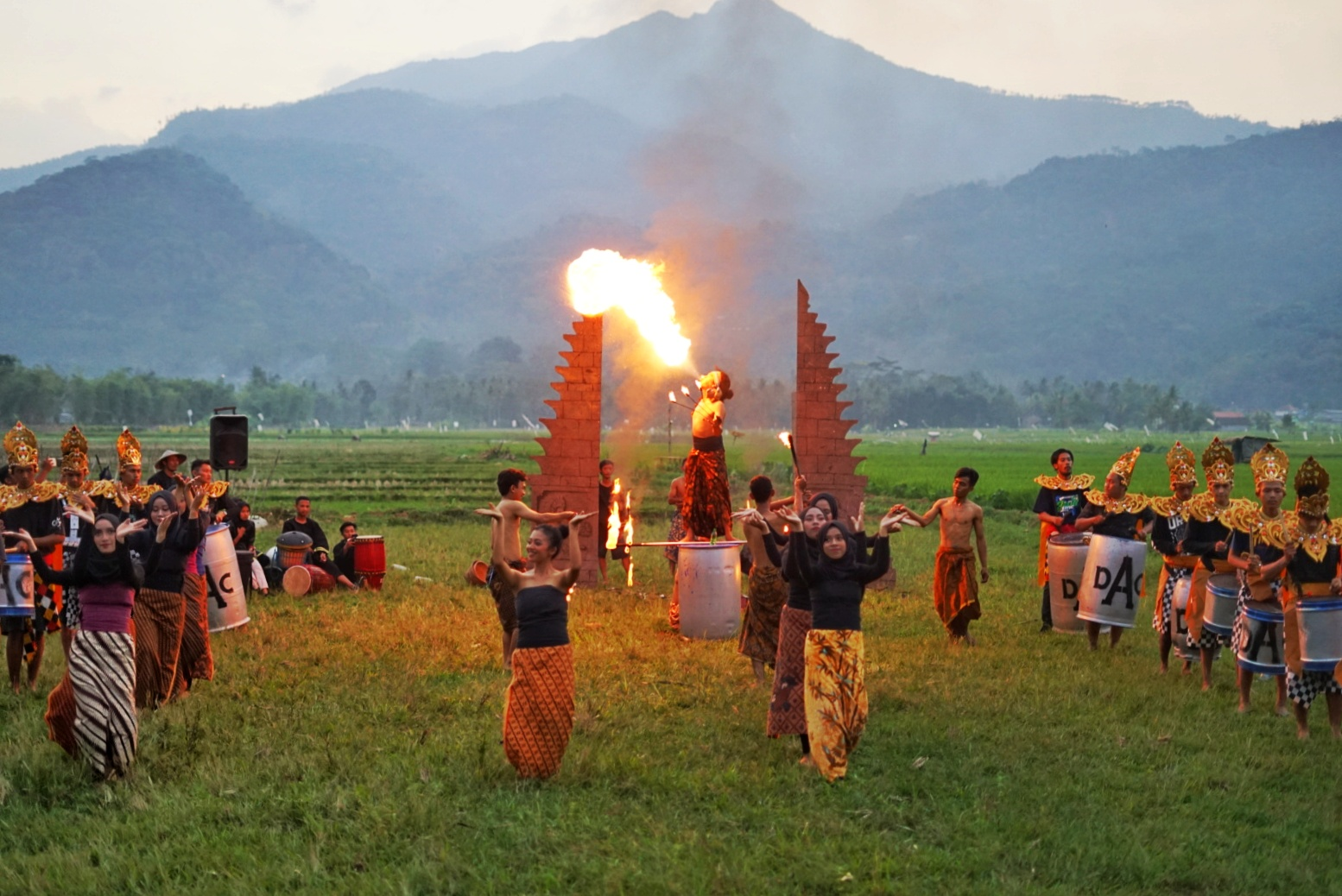
Javanese fire dance

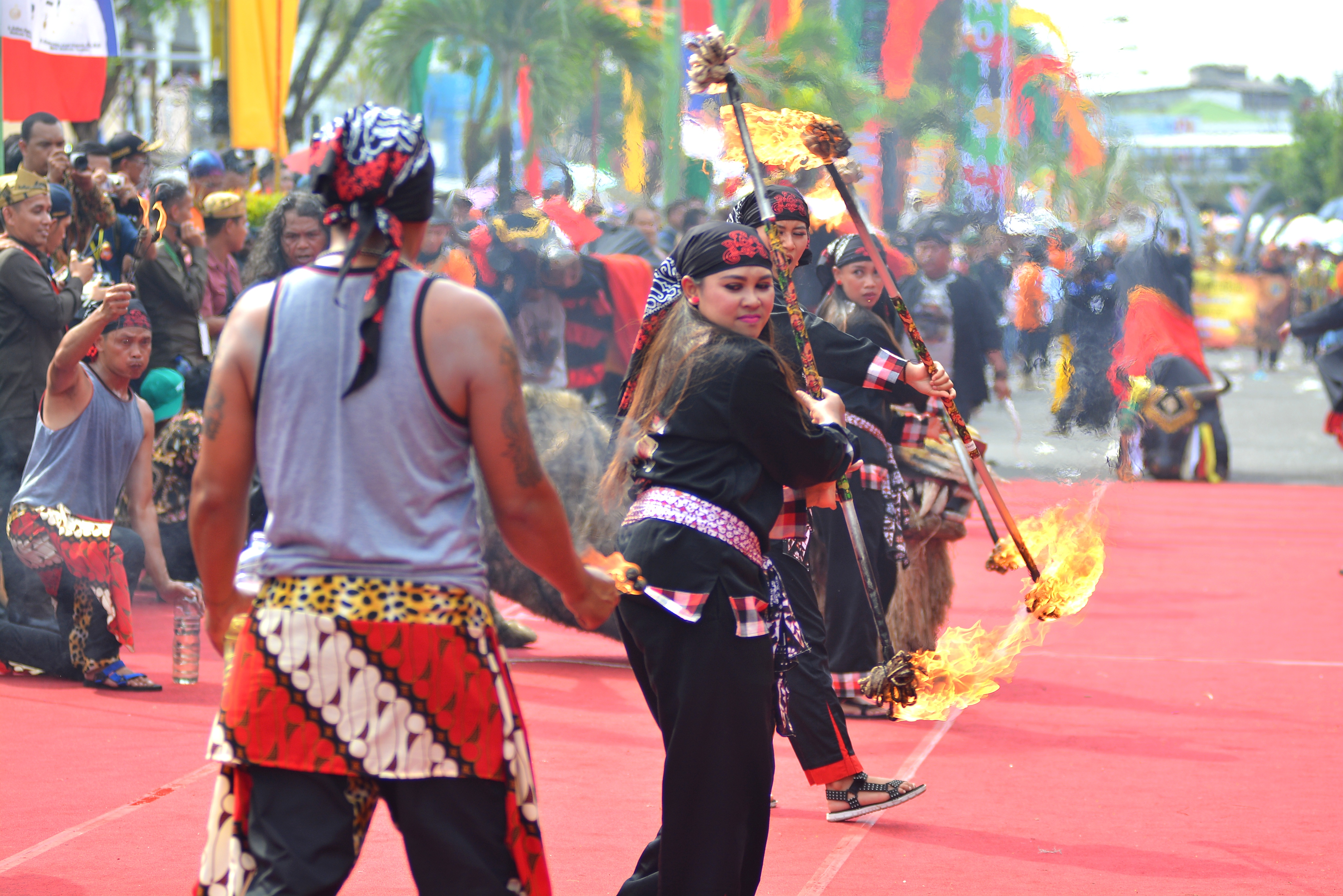
Tongkat Api dance

== See also ==
- Dance in Indonesia
- Culture of Indonesia
- Fire performance
