= Didong =

Indonesian traditional dance

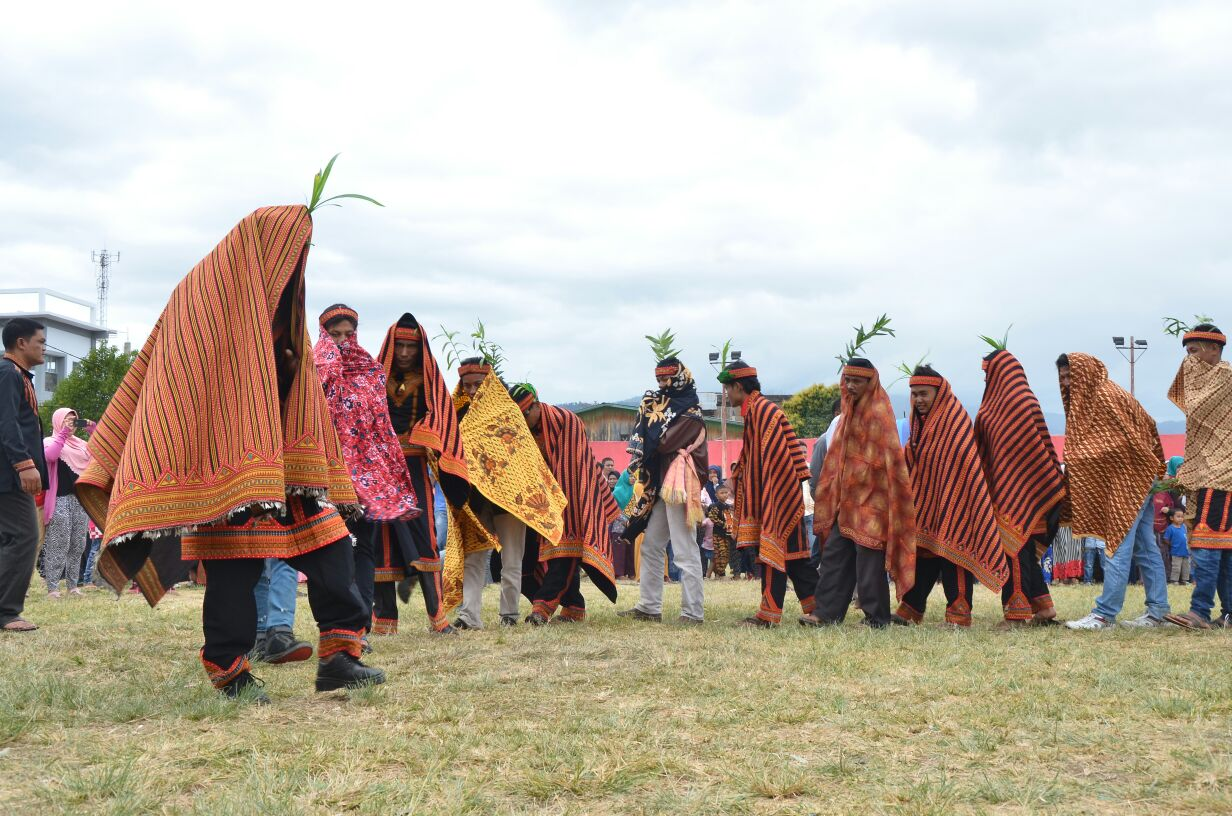
- Didong performance
- Genre: Traditional dance
- Inventor: Acehnese
- Origin: Indonesia

Didong is a Gayo folk art that combines elements of dance, vocals, and literature from Aceh, Indonesia. The performing arts of Didong are performed by men in groups (usually 15 in number), with free expression, while sitting cross-legged or standing, stomping their feet. They sing Gayo-language poems in a melodious voice, while beating drums, pillows or pots and clapping their hands in various ways, giving rise to beautiful and interesting sounds and movements.

The poems that are sung with the power of combining the configuration of the art of motion, literature, and sound are like "bewitching" the audience to "float" and continue to hear social and religious reflections from the ceh-ceh didong on various social problems that exist in society, along with the relationship between humans and nature, so that life can be handled wisely.

== See also ==
- Saman dance
- Dance in Indonesia
