= Yapong dance =

Betawi traditional dance

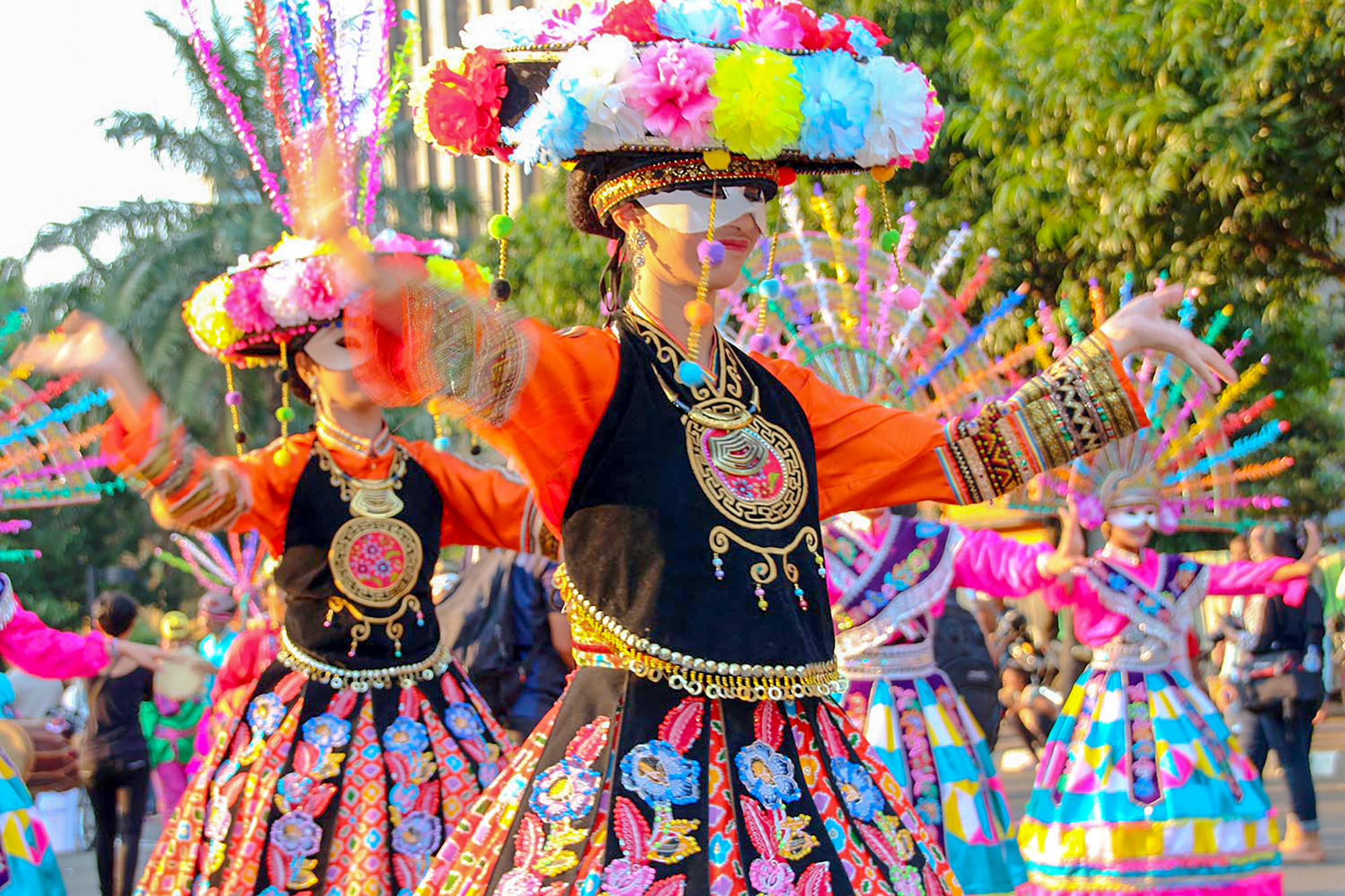
- Yapong dance performance
- Instrument(s): Rebana, Gamelan
- Inventor: Betawi
- Origin: Greater Jakarta (Indonesia)

Yapong dance is a Betawi dance originating in Jakarta, Indonesia. This dance depicts the association of young people created by the artist Bagong Kussudiardja. The Yapong dance was performed for the first time to enliven Jakarta's 450th anniversary event in 1977.

== History ==
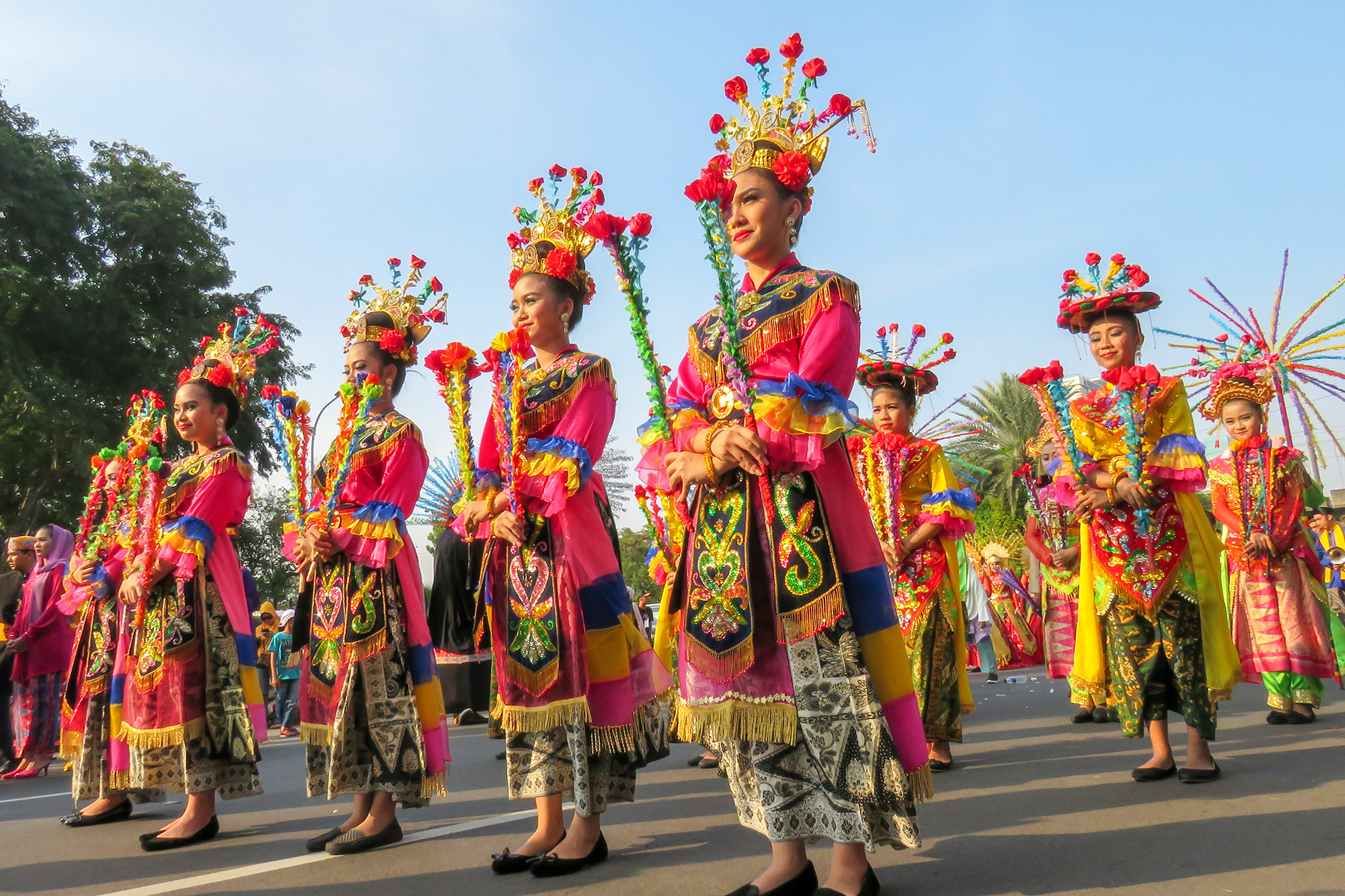
Yapong dancers wearing traditional clothes

The Yapong dance was first performed to prepare for the 450th anniversary of the city of Jakarta in 1977. At that time, the Dinas Kebudayaan DKI prepared a mass dance performance with the story of the struggle of Prince Jayakarta. The performance, in the form of a ballet, was entrusted to Bagong Kussudiarjo to organize the event. To prepare for the performance, Bagong conducted research for several months on the lives of the Betawi people. Bagong carried out this research through libraries, films, slides, and direct observations of the Betawi people. Finally, this performance was successfully staged on 20 and 21 June 1977 at the Senayan Convention Center, Jakarta. The performance was supported by 300 artists and musicians who took part in it.

This dance is a joyful dance with dynamic and exotic movements. In the Yapong dance movement, a happy atmosphere is shown because it welcomes the arrival of Prince Jayakarta. The scene is named Yapong and does not contain any meaning. The term comes from the song which reads ya, ya, ya which is sung by the accompanying singer and the sound of music that sounds pong, pong, pong , so that "ya-pong" is born which gradually develops into Yapong.

== Form and movement ==
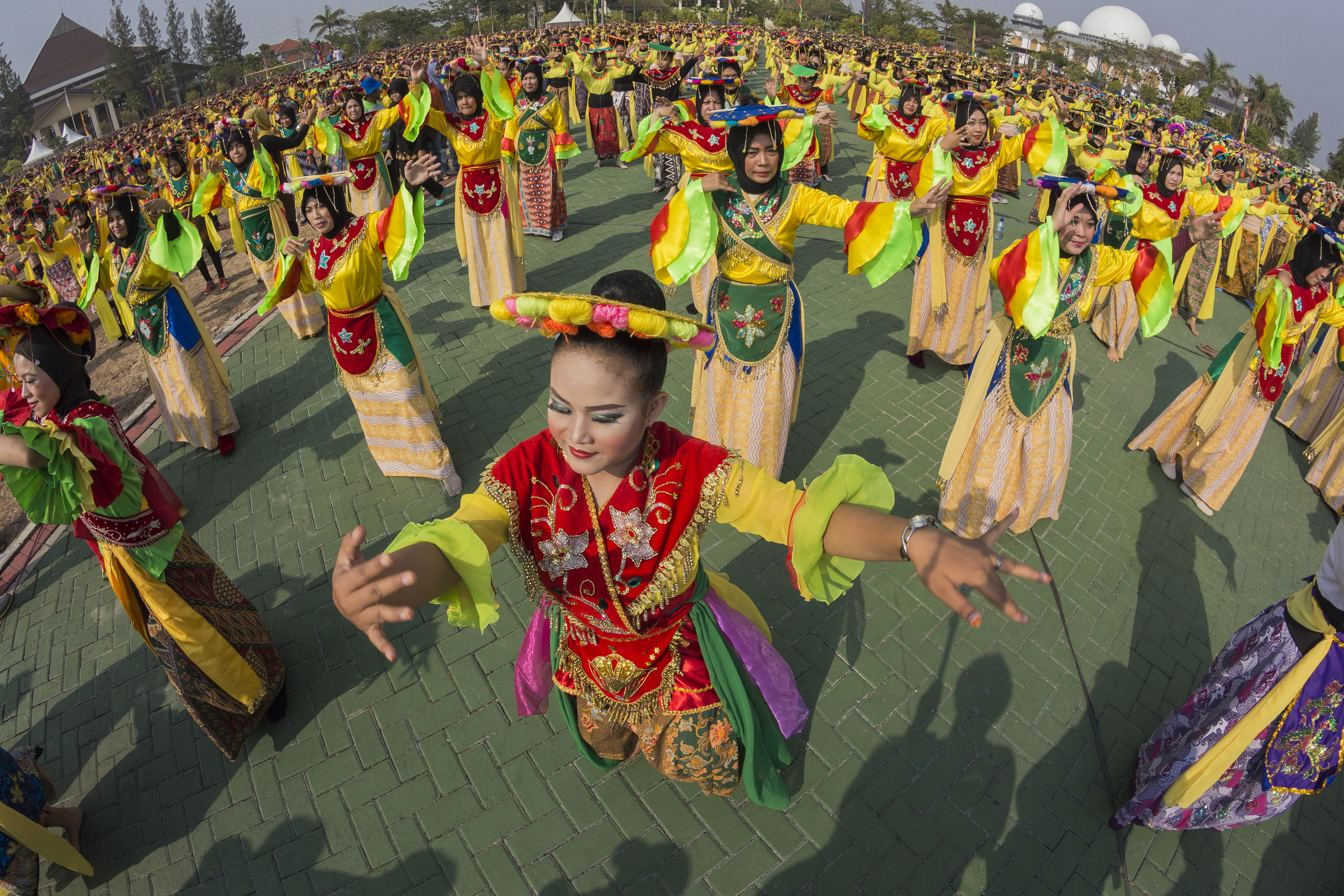
Colossal Yapong dance

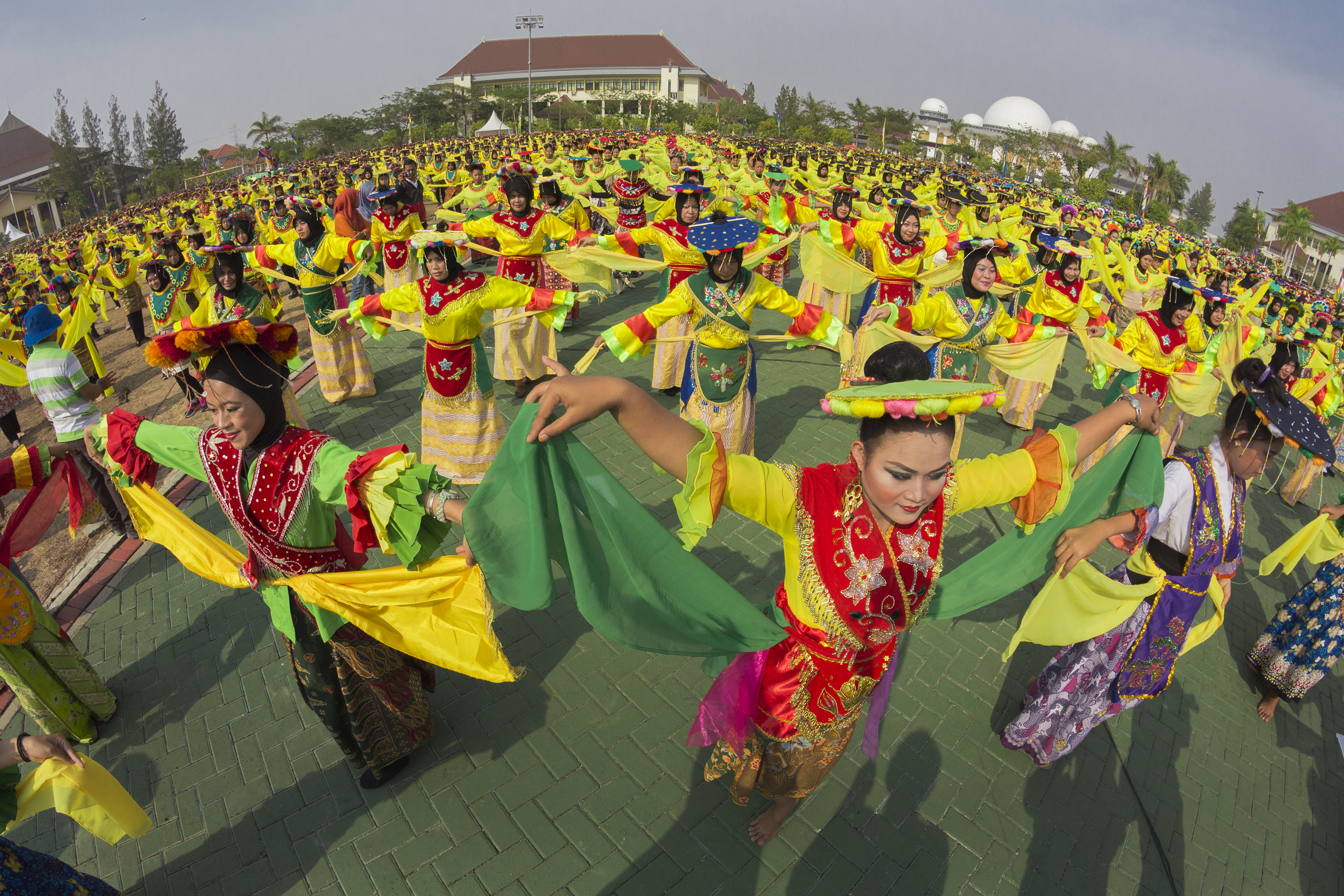
Hundreds of dancers demonstrate the yapong dance

The pattern in the clothes worn by the dancers is a development of the Betawi mask dancer clothes. This can be seen clearly from the shape and decoration of the headgear and the sash worn on the chest, which is called the toka-toka. Yapong dance is colored by Betawi folk dance, then processed by the inclusion of elements of pop dance, including elements of Sumatran dance. Because Betawi culture is heavily influenced by elements of Chinese culture, the Yapong dance also contains elements of Chinese art, for example on the cloth worn by the dancers there is a dragon motif with a bright red color which is identical to Chinese culture.

The musical instruments used in this dance are a mixture of Betawi, Javanese, and Sundanese. After this dance became a freelance dance, Jakarta used several traditional musical instruments, such as the Rebana Biang, Rebana Hadroh, and Rebana Ketimpring. Thus, Yapong dance is a new creation that departs from the elements of traditional Betawi movements.

== See also ==
- Ondel-ondel
- Ronggeng
- Dance in Indonesia
