= Kancet Papatai =

Indonesian traditional war dance

Kancet Papatai is a traditional war dance of the Dayah Kenyah people of Indonesia. It depicts the story of a hero’s battle against his enemies, highlighting his courage and the ceremony in which he is awarded the title Ajai for his victory.

The dance is characterized by very agile, nimble, and energetic movements, often accompanied by cries from the performers. Kancet Papatai is accompanied by Sak Paku songs and accompanied only by the sapeh, a traditional Indonesian lute.

== Dance Accompaniment ==
In every appearance of the Kancet Papatai Dance, the man (or Ajai), is typically accompanied by a woman who expresses two different types of dance:

- The Kancet Ledo dance, a dance by one woman which depicts "the gentleness of a girl as a piece of rice being gently blown by the wind". This dance is performed by a woman in traditional Dayak Kenyah costume holding a series of hornbill tail feathers in both hands. This dance is also usually accompanied with a gong, so the Kancet Ledo is also called a Gong Dance.
- The Kancet Lasan dance, depicting the everyday life of the hornbill, a bird glorified by Dayak Kenyah as a symbol of grandeur and heroism. The Kancet Lasan dance usually involves a number of women. They utilize the same movements and poses as the Kancet Ledo dance, but without gongs and feathers, and often employing positions expressing their humility, such as squatting or sitting with their knees touching the floor. This dance places more emphasis on the movements of hornbill when flying and when perched in a tree.

== Equipment ==
1. The Kelembit, a shield made of wood that is strong and light, but not easily broken, and decorated with carvings on its front, which initially functioned as a defensive weapon. Kelembit shields are displayed as examples of the fine art of the Dayak people in Kalimantan.
2. The Dayak sword, an heirloom that is passed from generation to generation, and is considered a sacred item containing supernatural powers. Along with the sword, a saber is also worn, tied to the waist. It is a tool used to cut herbs and other objects, as most Dayaks spend the majority of their lives in the forest.
3. Dayak armor, which is made of bark, animal skins, and decorated metal. Often it is equipped with "fighting clothing writings" (tattoos), thought to protect the wearer in war.

== See also ==
- Hudoq
- Dayak people
