= Bajidor Kahot =

Indonesian traditional dance

Bajidor Kahot (Sundanese: ᮘᮏᮤᮓᮧᮁ ᮊᮠᮧᮒ᮪) is a Sundanese dance from Indonesia which combines the dance movements of Ketuk Tilu and Jaipongan as the basis of its motions. What distinguishes them from the two, Bajidor Kahot dance does not optimize shoulder movement as the Jaipongan and Tap Tilu do. In the dance, hips, arms, shoulders, head, and hands move dynamically. Footsteps also incorporated into the dance. The dancers wear typical Sundanese kebaya. The kebaya is designed fit the shape of the body and the clothes are brightly colored. Additional accessories such as scarves and fan are incorporated into the dance. Often the dancers are also moving in formation of interest. Bajidor Kahot dance was created c. 2000. In each show, dance is always accompanied by a typical drum from the land of Pasundan. In addition, the Balinese gamelan music adds to the wealth of music that accompanies the dance. As in Jaipongan, Bajidor Kahot is often performed by young women. The dance usually performed by four to eight dancers.

== See also ==
- Jaipongan
- Sundanese culture
