= Condon =

Condon may refer to:

== Places ==
=== Australia ===
- Condon, Queensland
- Condon, Western Australia, a.k.a. Shellborough

=== United States ===
- Condon, Montana
- Condon, Oregon and the nearby
  - summit of Condon Butte

=== Other places ===
- Condon (crater) on the Moon

== Other uses ==
- Condon (surname), an Irish surname
- Condon Committee

== See also ==
- Codon (nucleotides for genetic code)
- Condom (disambiguation)
- Condong (Balinese dance)
- Condong, New South Wales
- Conlon
- Kondon (disambiguation)
