= Baris dance =

Indonesian traditional dance

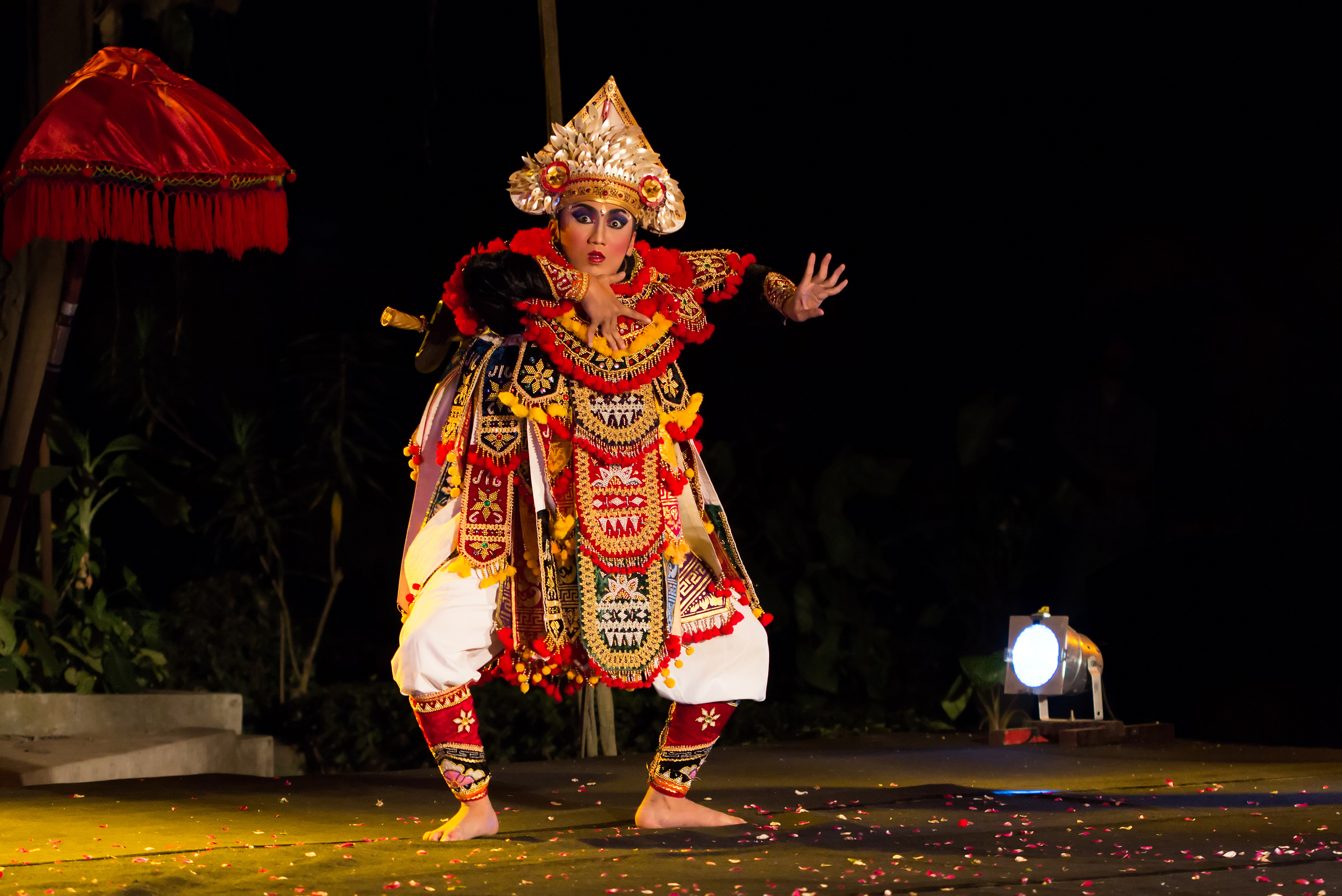
- A baris tunggal dancer
- Native name: ᬩᬭᬶᬲ᭄, igélan baris (Balinese); Tari Baris (Indonesian)
- Genre: Traditional dance
- Instrument(s): Gamelan, Gong
- Origin: Indonesia

Three genres of traditional dance in Bali
- UNESCO Intangible Cultural Heritage
- Country: Indonesia
- Reference: 00617
- Region: Asia and the Pacific

Inscription history
- Inscription: 2015 (10th session)
- List: Representative
- Wali Sacred Dances (Rejang, Sanghyang Dedari, Baris Upacara), Bebali Semi sacred Dances (Topeng Sidhakarya/Topeng Pajegan, Gambuh dance drama, Wayang Wong dance drama), Balih-balihan Entertainment Dances (Legong Kraton, Joged Bumbung, Barong Ket)

Baris dance (Balinese: ᬩᬭᬶᬲ᭄, igélan baris) is a family of traditional war dances in Bali, Indonesia, accompanied by gamelan, in which dancers depict the feelings of a young warrior prior to battle, glorify the manhood of the triumphant Balinese warrior, and display the sublimity of his commanding presence. Baris derives its name from the word bebarisan, which literally means "line" or "file formation", referring to the soldiers who served the ancient rajas of Bali.

== Performance ==
There are two main types of baris dance which can be found throughout the island of Bali. The non-ritual dance is performed by a solo male dancer and is often the first dance that a budding dancer learns. However, there are over thirty different types of ritual baris dances, each of which is performed by a group of people, still imitating the movements of the warrior.

=== Baris tunggal ===
A baris tunggal dancer, namely a baris dancer who performs on his own, is dressed in white leggings, known as celana. Around his ankles are coverings, known as setewel, which reach halfway up his calves. The dancer wears a belt (setagen), reaching up on his body; inside this belt, a keris is tucked near the shoulder. Around the dancer's torso is a collection of fabric panels, known as awiran, which hang from his body. Another panel, larger, is fixed to his chest. Around his neck he wears a circular collar known as a badong; this collar may or may not be decorated with beads. The costume is completed with a triangular headdress made of shells on springs, which shake during the performance.

=== Group dances ===
There are a variety of group formats for the baris dance, including baris gde, baris keris, baris omang, baris perisi, and baris dadap. These dances are accompanied by different types of music and involve different movements. Dancers may carry a variety of weapons, including a kris, a spear, a bow, or other weapons; often dances are named after the weapons carried. The performances may or may not attempt to convey a story. All, however, are considered sacral, and used for religious ceremonies and events.

Among these dances is the baris demang, which dates back to the 19th century (a drawing of a performance was acquired by Herman Neubronner van der Tuuk while in Bali). In such a dance, dancers wear costumes similar to those worn by the demang in gambuh performances and carry wooden knives. This dance is usually performed during the Pemayun ritual.

In baris biasa, dancers are armed with spears. Such dances are generally brief, and involve a form of playfighting known as masesraman, in which the wooden spears are knocked against each other. Dancers (who can be either male or, when they are fulfilling priestly roles, female) do not wear special costumes; they are only garbed in normal headgear and cloth. The baris biasa dance is generally performed in the morning, following temple activities.

Other versions include baris panah (in which the dancers are armed with arrows), baris presi (in which the dancers are armed with round shields), and baris dadap (in which dancers are armed with elongated, oblong shields). Baris presi is common throughout northern and southern Bali. Baris dadap, however, was limited in range by the 1980s. Dancers

== Gallery ==
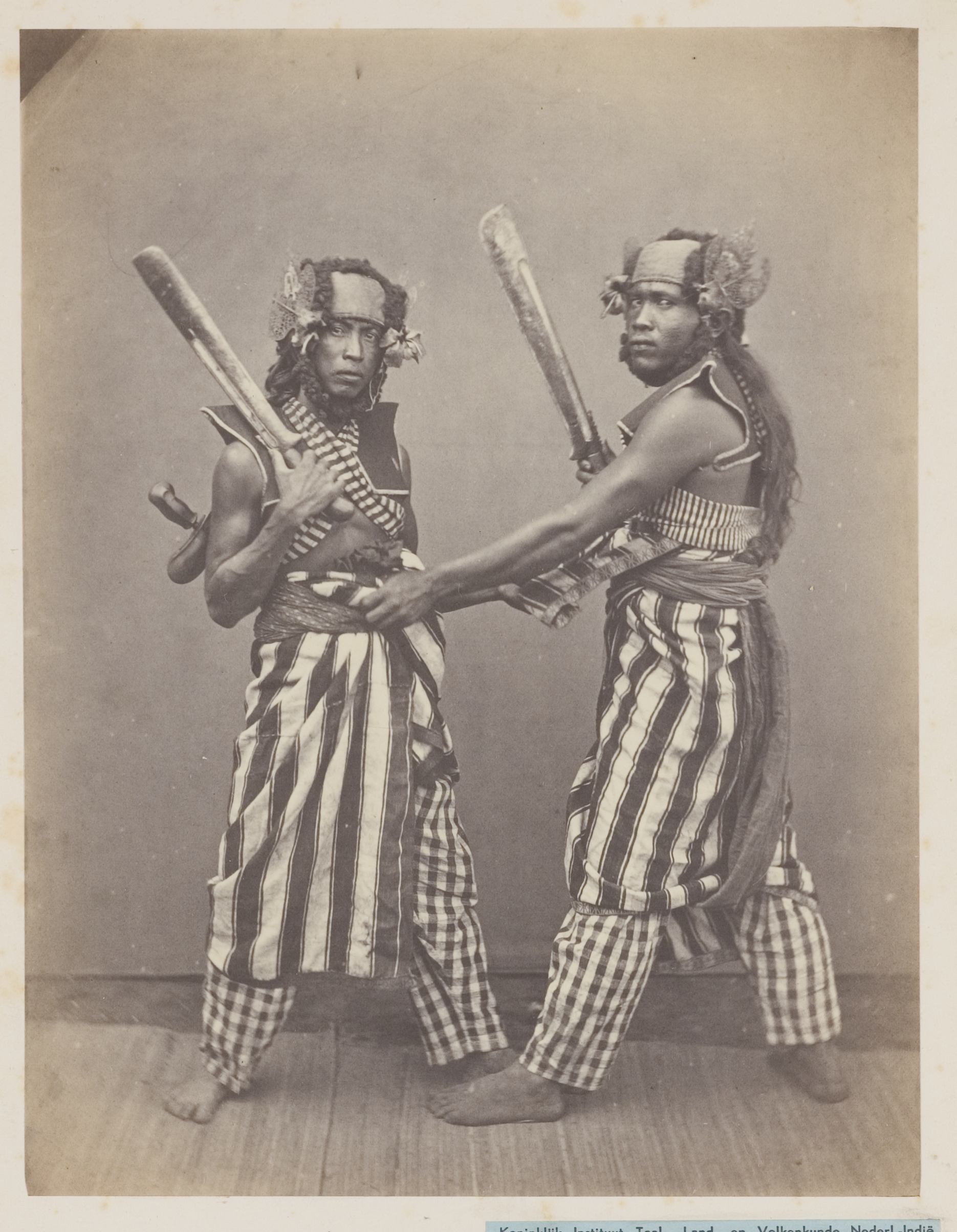
Baris demang dancers in Singaraja (1865–1866); photo by Isidore van Kinsbergen

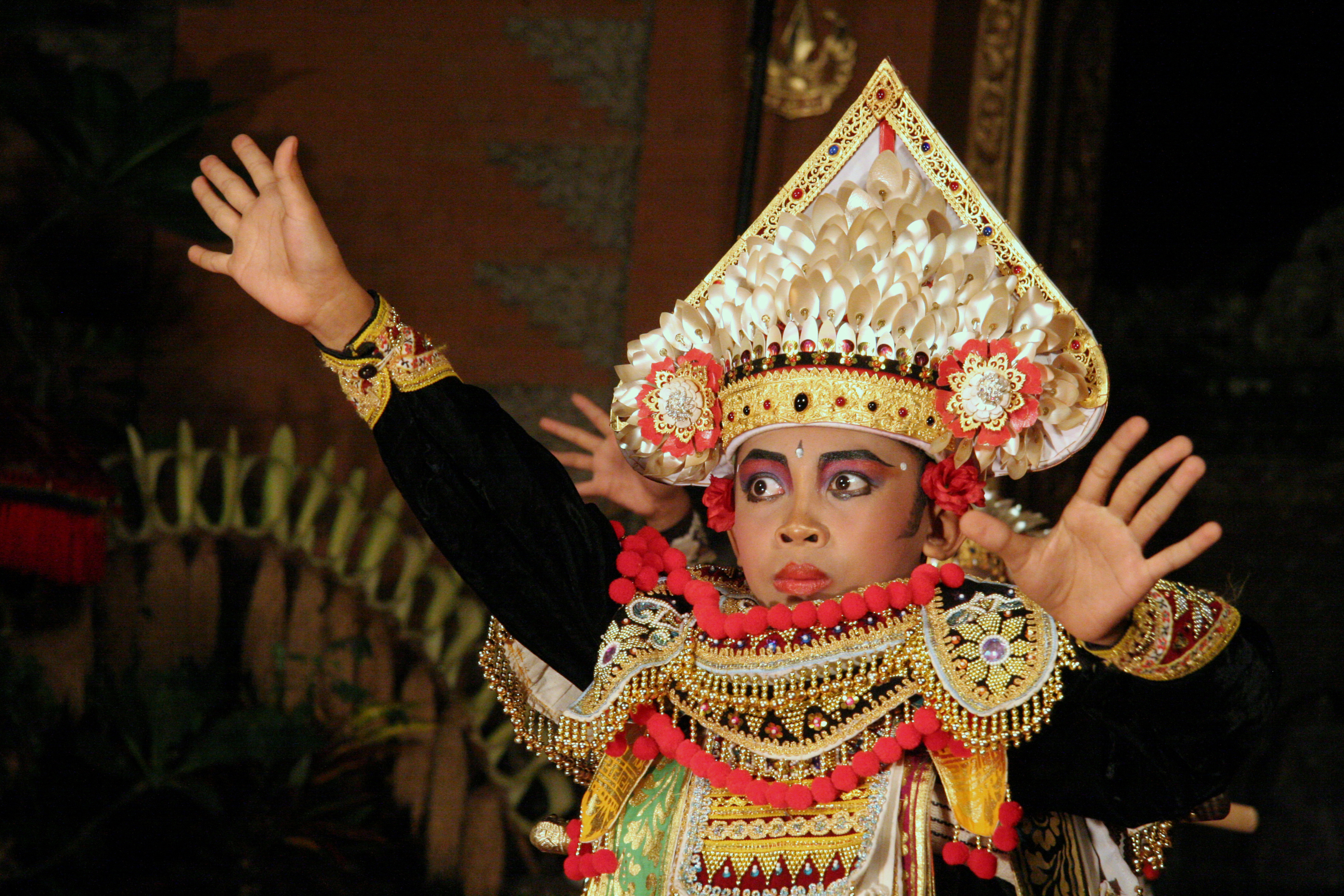
Baris dance performance

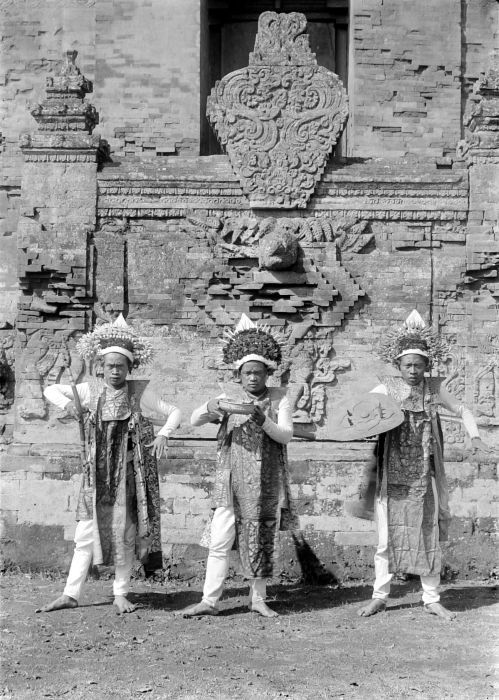

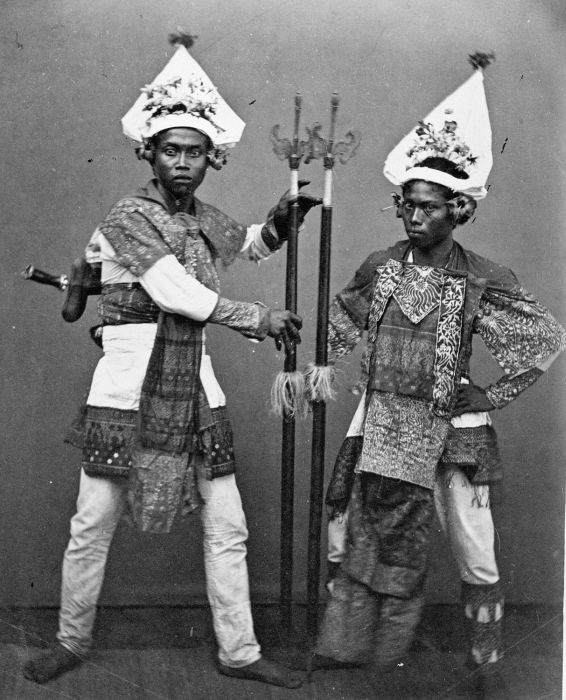

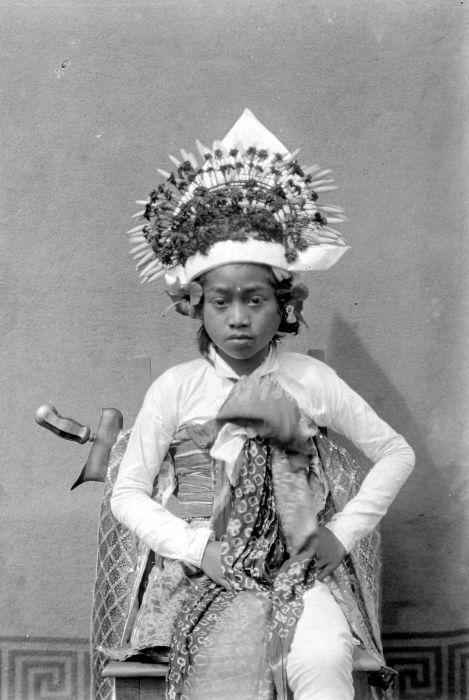

== See also ==
- Balinese dance
- Kecak
- Sanghyang
