= Rejang dance =

Sacred Indonesian dance

Rejang
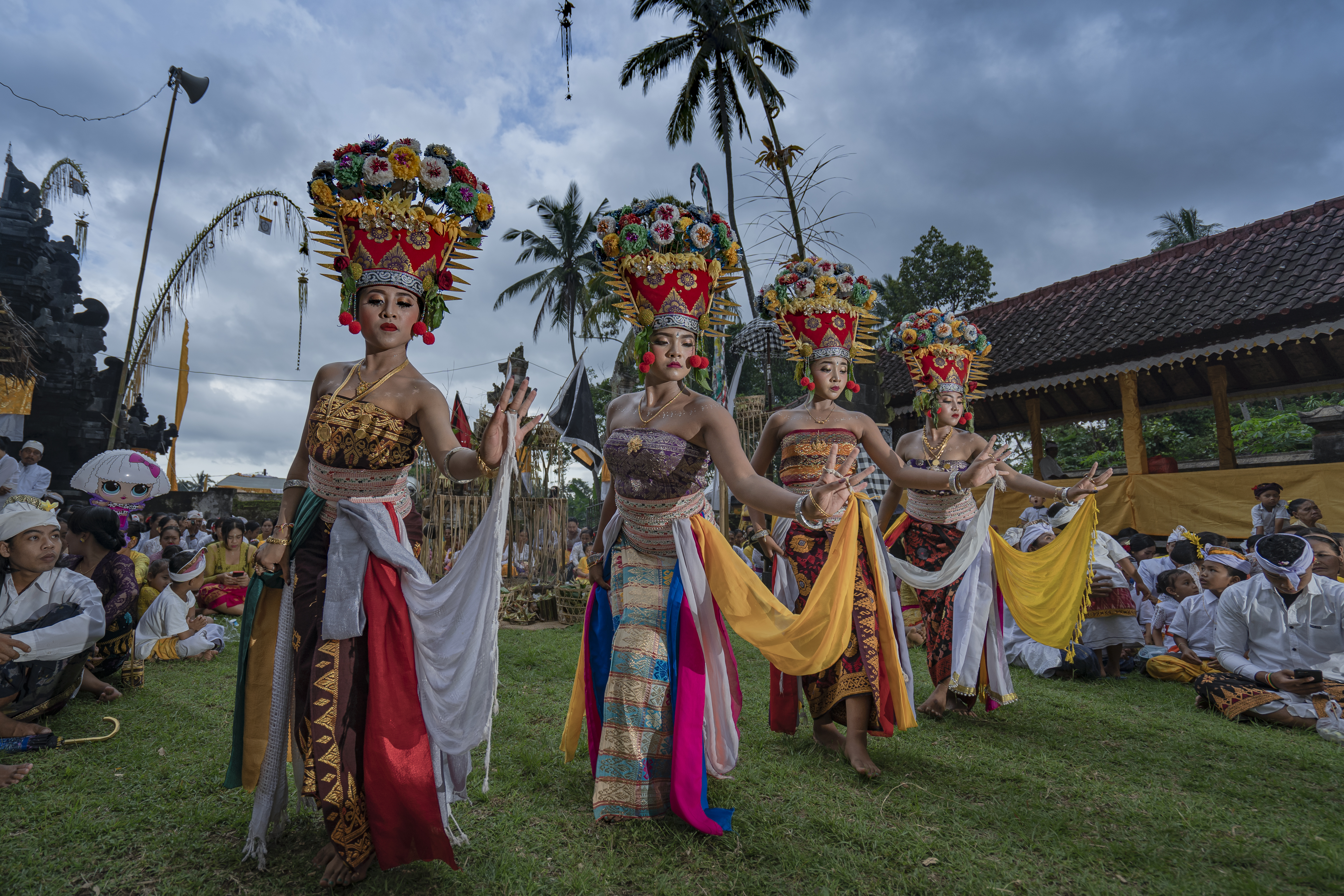
- Rejang, the sacred Balinese dance
- Native name: ᬋᬚᬂ (Balinese); Tari Rejang (Indonesian)
- Genre: Sacred dance
- Instrument(s): Gamelan, Gong, Kendhang
- Inventor: Balinese
- Origin: Indonesia

Three genres of traditional dance in Bali
- UNESCO Intangible Cultural Heritage
- Country: Indonesia
- Reference: 00617
- Region: Asia and the Pacific

Inscription history
- Inscription: 2015 (10th session)
- List: Representative
- Wali Sacred Dances (Rejang, Sanghyang Dedari, Baris Upacara), Bebali Semi sacred Dances (Topeng Sidhakarya/Topeng Pajegan, Gambuh dance drama, Wayang Wong dance drama), Balih-balihan Entertainment Dances (Legong Kraton, Joged Bumbung, Barong Ket)

Rejang dance (Balinese: ᬋᬚᬂ) is a sacred Balinese dance, a sacrificial dance in which the girls offer themselves to the gods. It is usually held at the Hindu temple's of Klungkung Regency and Karangasem Regency in Bali, Indonesia. “Rejang” means “offering”, a dance to greet the gods that come down to the Earth. This dance is part of the sacred offering ceremonies, which all happen around about the same time on Bali's ceremonial calendar.

The main occasion is arranged as a three-day ceremony at the village hall of Bale Agung. The dancers required no prior training, believing that the spirit of ngayah would guide them to perform the dance movements harmoniously. Girls as young as two or three can be included in the procession. The dance is also known as ngeremas, Simi, or sutri.

== See also ==
- Pendet
- Joged
- Janger
- Balinese dance
