= Balinese dance =

Indonesian ancient dance tradition

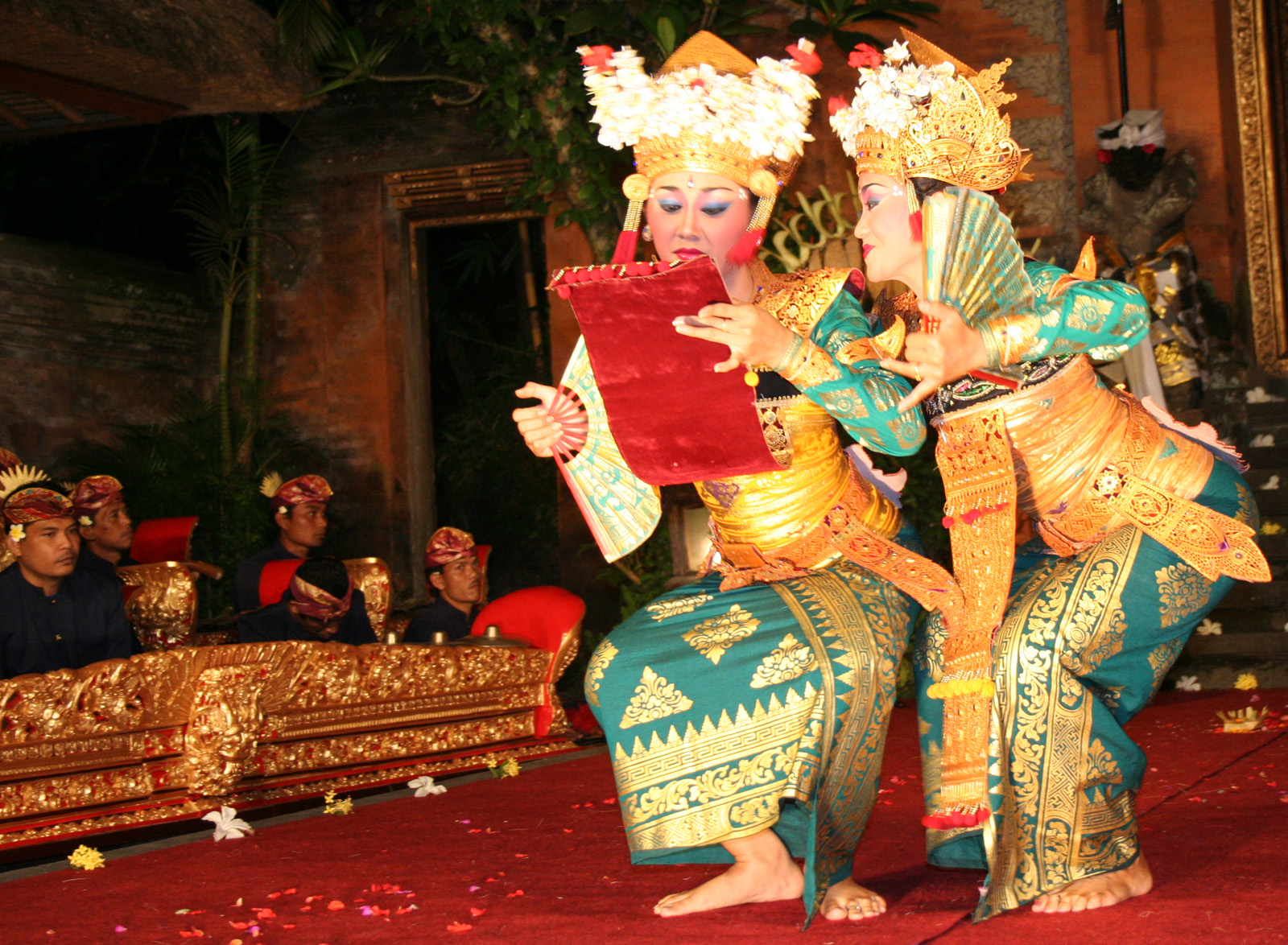
- Legong Keraton Dance performance with Gamelan ensemble in Puri Saren Ubud, Bali
- Types: Traditional
- Originating culture: Balinese

Three genres of traditional dance in Bali
- UNESCO Intangible Cultural Heritage
- Country: Indonesia
- Reference: 00617
- Region: Asia and the Pacific

Inscription history
- Inscription: 2015 (10th session)
- List: Representative
- Wali Sacred Dances (Rejang, Sanghyang Dedari, Baris Upacara), Bebali Semi sacred Dances (Topeng Sidhakarya/Topeng Pajegan, Gambuh dance drama, Wayang Wong dance drama), Balih-balihan Entertainment Dances (Legong Kraton, Joged Bumbung, Barong Ket)

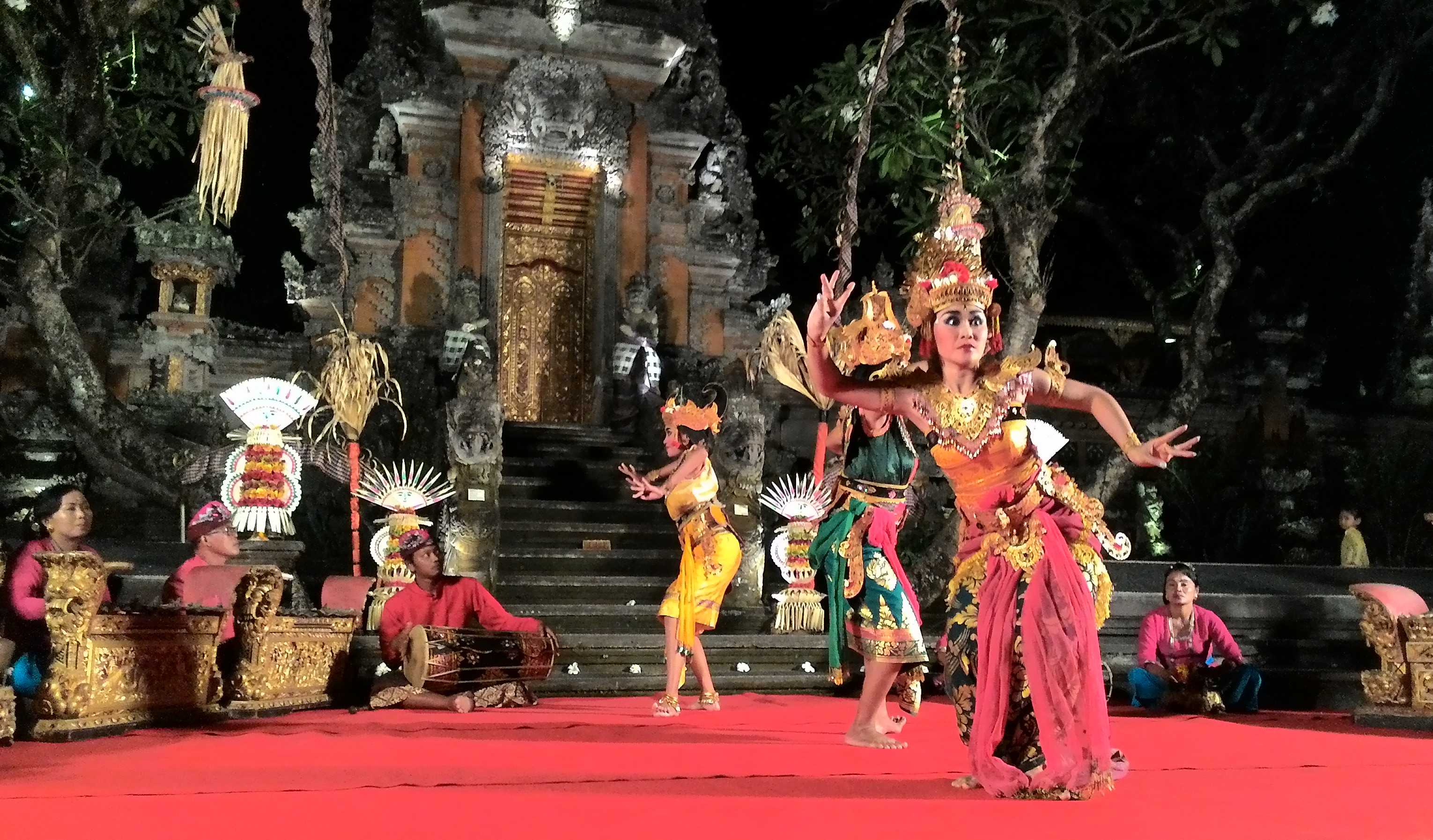
Cultural performances such as Balinese Ramayana traditional dance are popular tourist attractions especially in Ubud, Bali.

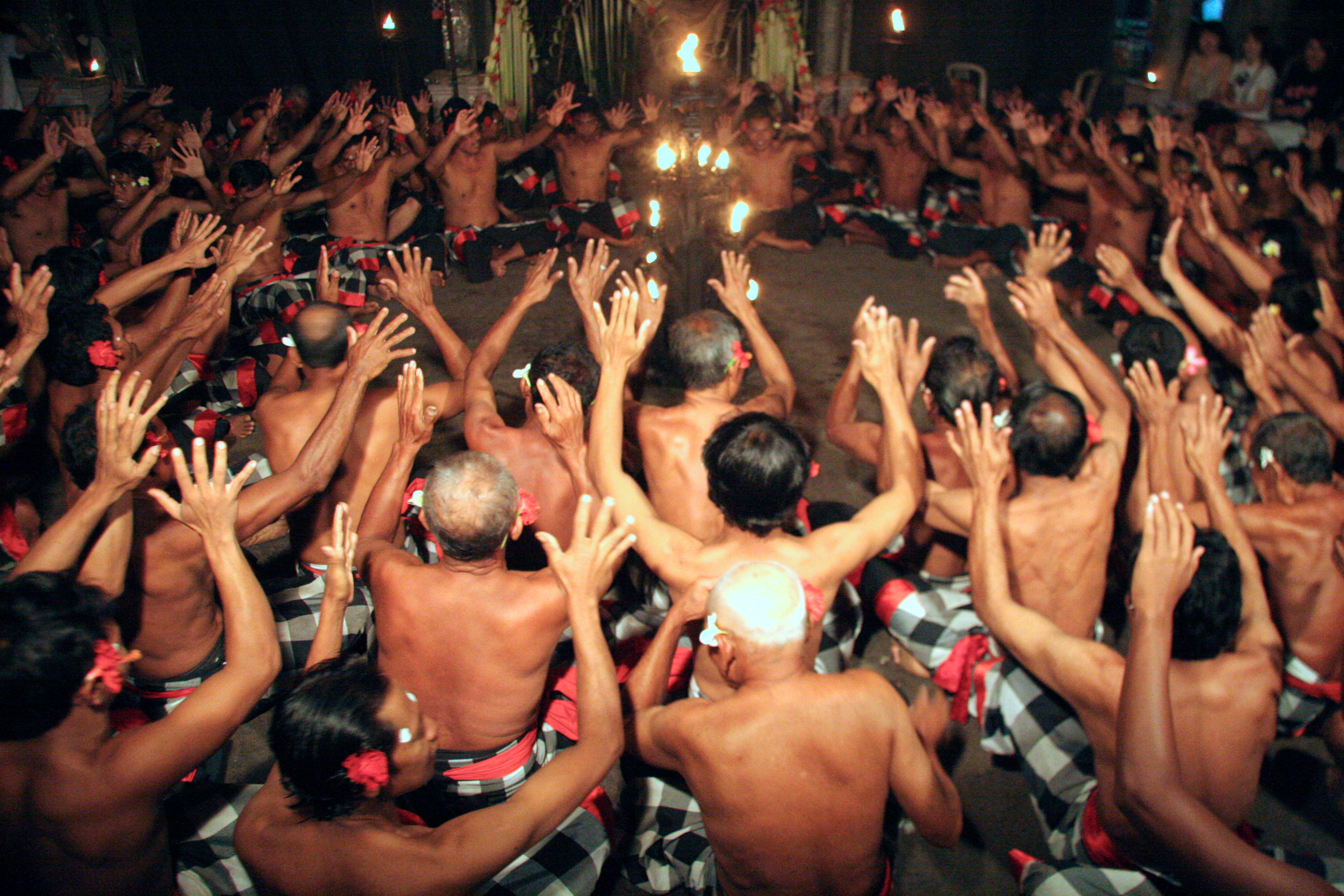
Kecak dance performed by many male dancers.

Balinese dance (Indonesian: tarian Bali; Balinese: ᬇᬕᭂᬮᬦ᭄ᬩᬮᬶ (igélan Bali)) is an ancient dance tradition that is part of the religious and artistic expression among the Balinese people of Bali island, Indonesia. Balinese dance is dynamic, angular, and intensely expressive. Balinese dancers express the stories of dance-drama through bodily gestures including gestures of fingers, hands, head, and eyes.

There is a great richness of dance forms and styles in Bali; and particularly notable are those ritualistic dance dramas which involve Rangda, the witch, and the great beast Barong. Most of the dances in Bali are connected to Balinese Hindu or traditional animist and folk rituals, such as the Sanghyang Dedari sacred dance that invokes benevolent hyang spirits, believed to possess the dancers in a trance state during the performance. Other Balinese dances are not linked to religious rituals and are created for certain occasions or purposes, such as the Baris or Pendet welcoming dances and Joged dance, which is a social dance for entertainment.

== Recognition and conservation ==
During the Intergovernmental Committee for the Safeguarding of the Intangible Cultural Heritage convention from 29 November to 4 December 2015 in Windhoek, Namibia, UNESCO recognized three genres of traditional dance in Bali, Indonesia, as Intangible cultural heritage. The three genres include Wali (sacred dances), Bebali (semi-sacred dances), and Balih-balihan (dances for entertainment purposes). Balinese dance has been proposed since 2011, and was officially recognized in 2015.

The three genres are represented by nine dances, which describe their function and living tradition in the Balinese community, they are:

Wali Sacred Dances

1. Rejang (Klungkung District). Sacred ceremonial dance by young women in traditional ceremonial dress,
2. Sanghyang Dedari (Karangasem District). Sacred trance dance to counteract negative supernatural forces. Performed by two young girls.
3. Baris Upacara (Bangli District) religious dances convey a heroic spirit danced by even numbers of male dancers.

Bebali Semi Sacred Dances

1. Topeng Sidhakarya/Topeng Pajegan (Tabanan District). Performed by masked dancers to neutralize the evil spirits.
2. Gambuh dance drama (Gianyar District). Formerly royal theatrical performance, now accompaniment to ceremonies, by 25-40 dancers.
3. Wayang Wong Dance Drama (Buleleng District). Combines dance, epic drama, and music.

Balih-balihan Entertainment Dances

1. Legong Kraton (Denpasar City). Dance by 2 or 3 girls. Developed from Sanghyang Dedari, and Gambuh.
2. Joged Bumbung (Buleleng District). A popular social dance by couples, during harvest season or on important days.
3. Barong Ket "Kuntisraya" (Badung District). Represents a fight between two mythological characters, Barong in the form of a lion symbolizing goodness, and Rangda, an evil witch.

== Significance ==
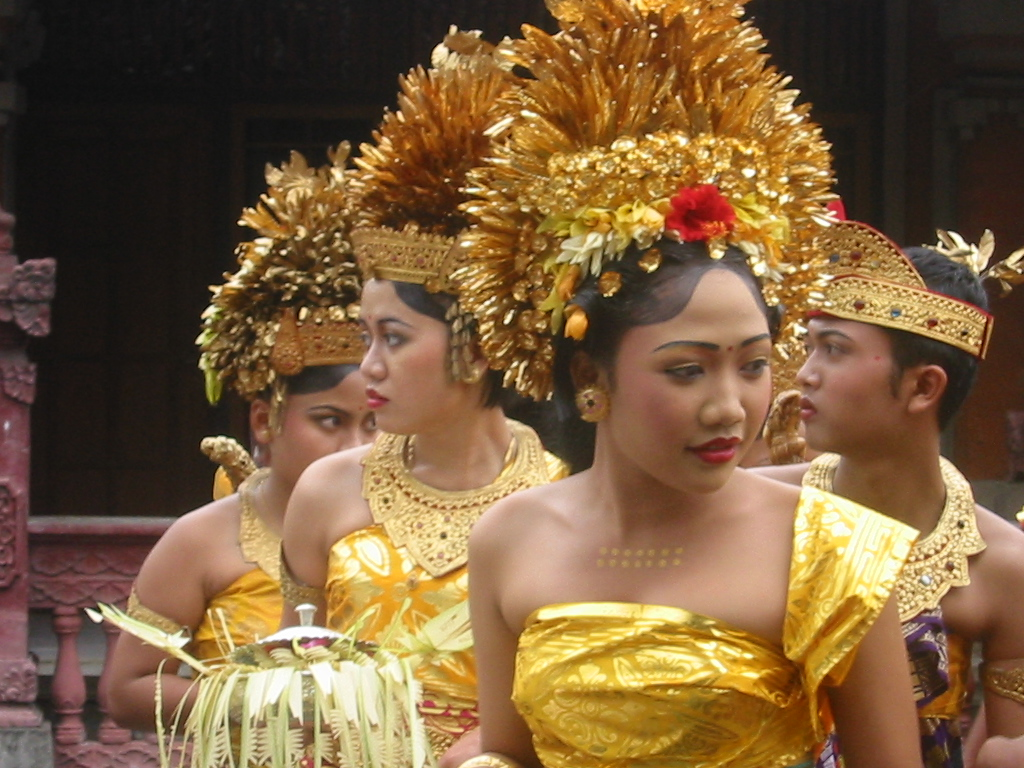
Ornaments used in Balinese dances.

In Hinduism, dance is an accompaniment to the perpetual dissolving and reforming of the world. The creative and reproductive balance is often personified as Shiva's wife, Durga, sometimes called Uma, Parvati, or Kali. This has significance in Balinese Hinduism since the common figure of Rangda is similar in many ways to Durga.

== Variants ==
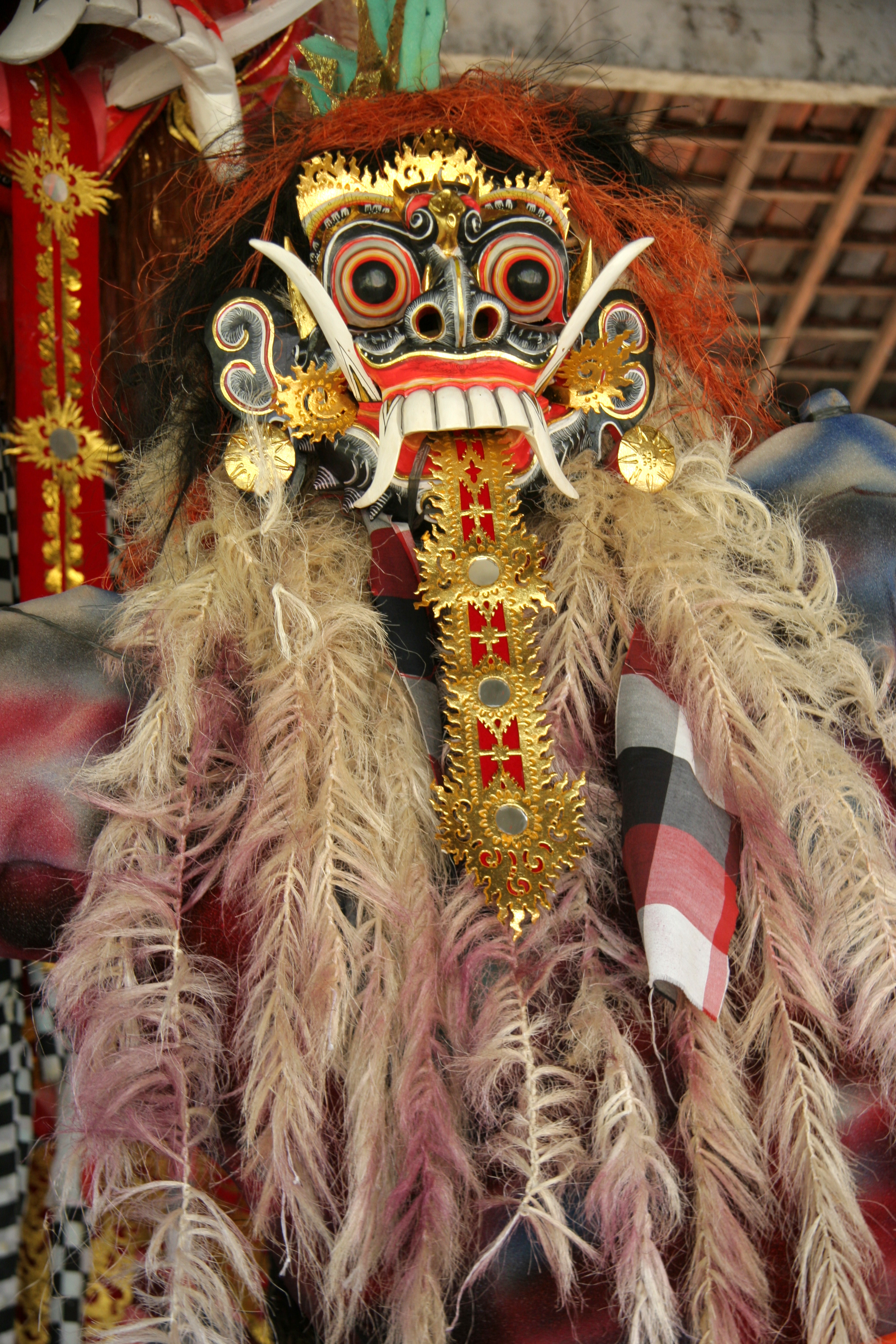
Rangda dancer.

In Bali there are various categories of dance, including epic performances such as the omnipresent Mahabharata and Ramayana. Certain ceremonies at village temples feature a special performance of a dance-drama, a battle between the mythical characters Rangda, the witch representing evil, and Barong, the lion or dragon, representing good. This type of performance was traditionally featured during outbreaks of epidemic diseases which were believed by the people to be a result of a disturbance in the balance of the 'good and bad forces', which were represented by the Rangda and the Barong. The battle usually reconciles in harmony or balance of the Rangda and the Barong, instead of a defeat of the evil.

Among the dance traditions in Bali are:

- Barong, king of the spirits
- Baris war dances
- Cendrawasih, the bird of paradise
- Condong, a basic dance, preface to Legong
- Legong, a refined dance
- Kecak, the Ramayana monkey chant dance
- Janger, a sitting dance with swaying movements
- Pendet, a simple dance performed before making an offering at a temple
- Tenun, a dance that describes women weaving the cloth
- Topeng, a mask dance

Traditionally, sacred dances can only be performed in temples. However, new choreographies have been created due to the demand from tourists. One example, Tari Sekar Jagat (Tari means dance in the Balinese language), is a relatively new choreography that has become popular. In the newer creations, choreographers have more freedom over the moves. They used new moves that were considered 'improper' for the sacred dances. For example, in Tari Sekar Jagat, there is a movement when the dancers hold the Dulang below their shoulders. This ceremonial pedestal, which may be wooden or ceramic, is normally held high following its sacredness. Below shoulder level but above the navel represents an ordinary or everyday state.

== Technique ==
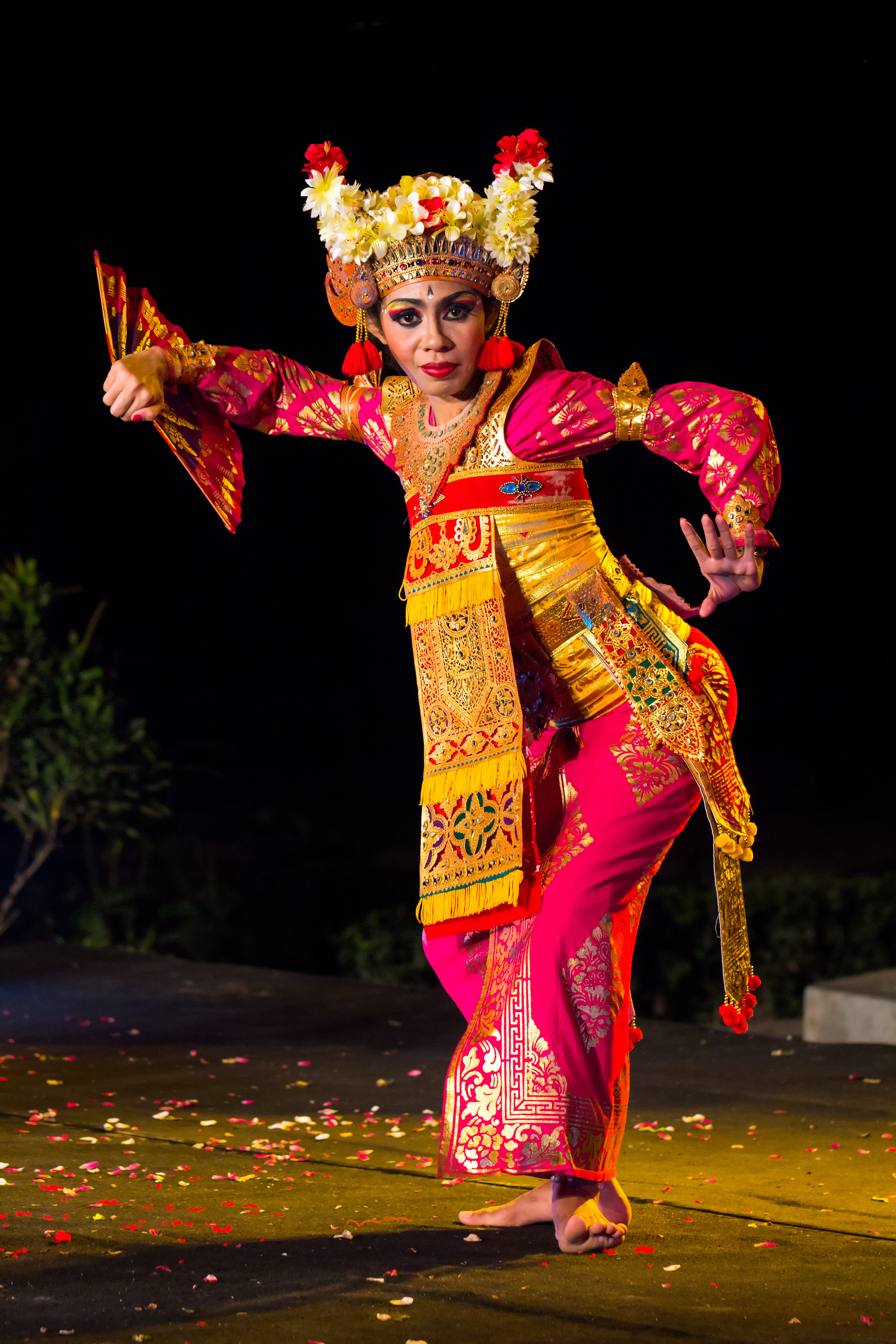
A woman dancing Legong Bapang Saba. Balinese dances incorporate eye and facial expressions.

Bali dancers learn the craft as children, they play Balinese music. They are taught to dance with their hands before they can walk. Official training as a Bali dancer starts as young as 7. In Balinese dance, the movement is closely associated with the rhythms produced by the gamelan, a musical ensemble specific to Java and Bali. Multiple levels of articulations in the face, eyes, hands, arms, hips, and feet are coordinated to reflect layers of percussive sounds.

The number of codified hand positions and gestures, the mudras, is higher in India than in Java or Bali. It has been speculated that they have been forgotten as the dance was transmitted from India to Java. Hand positions and gestures are nonetheless as important in Javanese and Balinese dance as in India. Whether in India, Indonesia, or Cambodia, hands have a typically ornamental role and emphasize the dance's delicate intricacy.

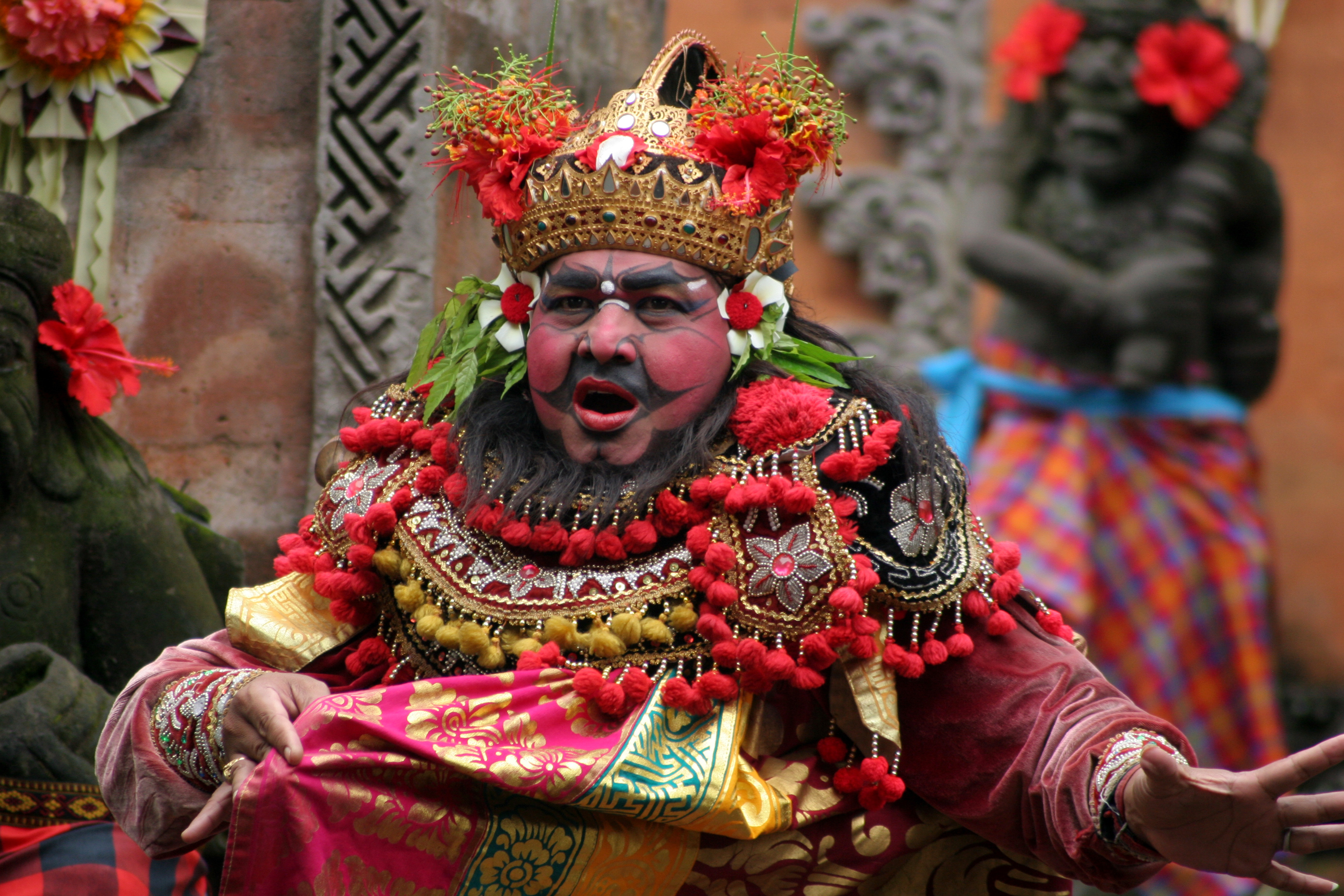
A man dancing Balinese Barong.

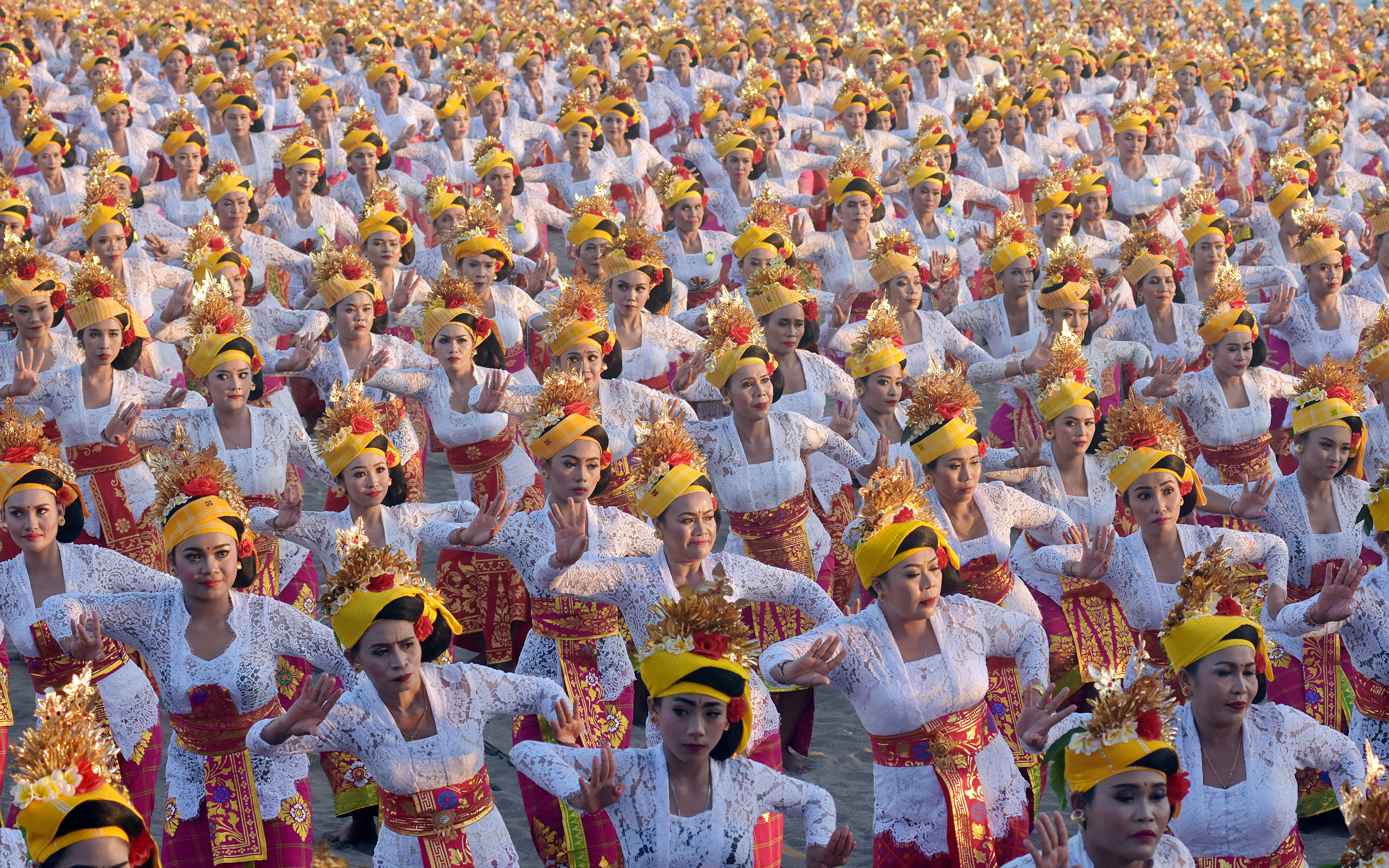
Balinese Tari Tenun (weaving dance) mass dance, performed by hundreds of dancers.

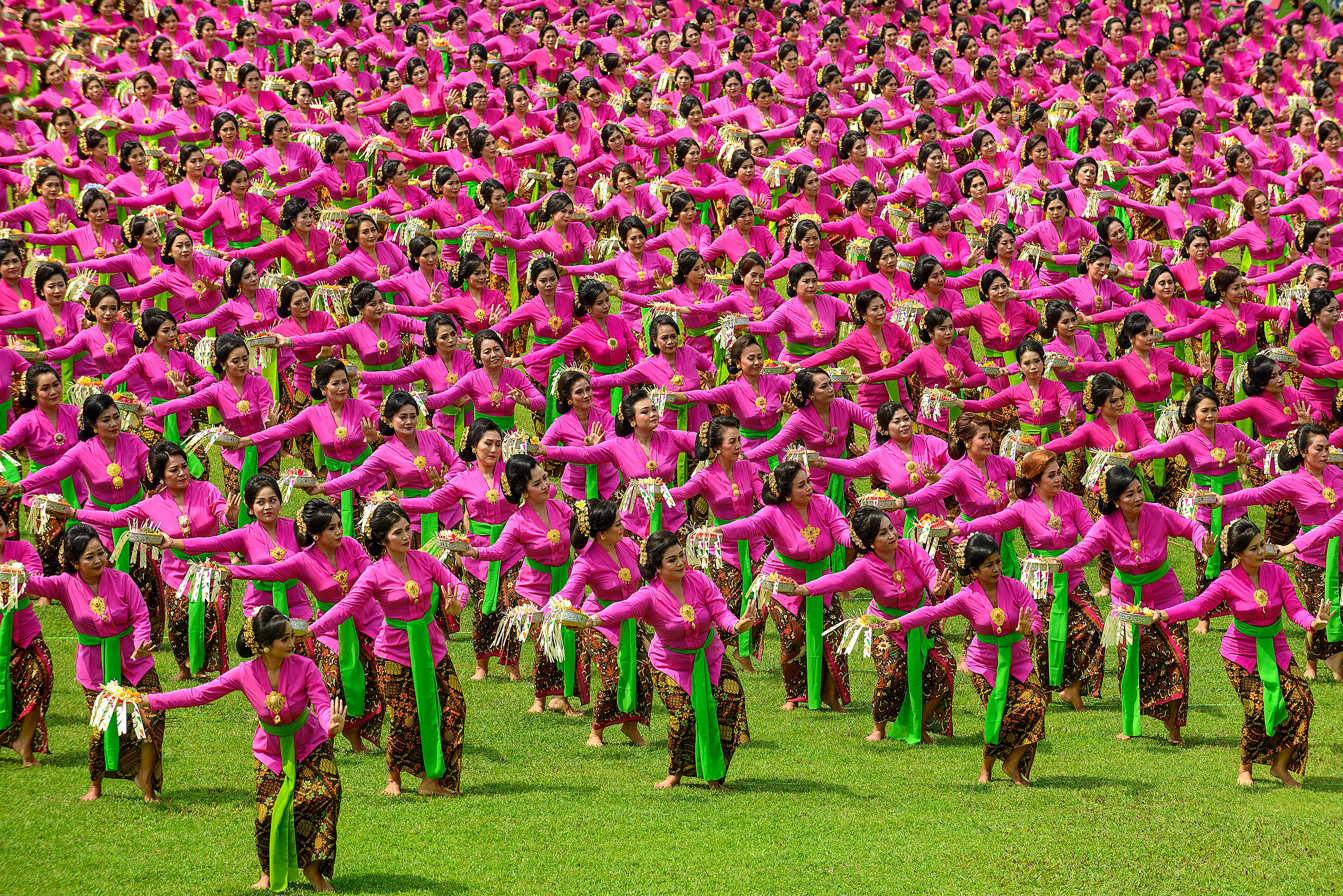
Balinese Tari pendet, performed by hundreds of dancers.

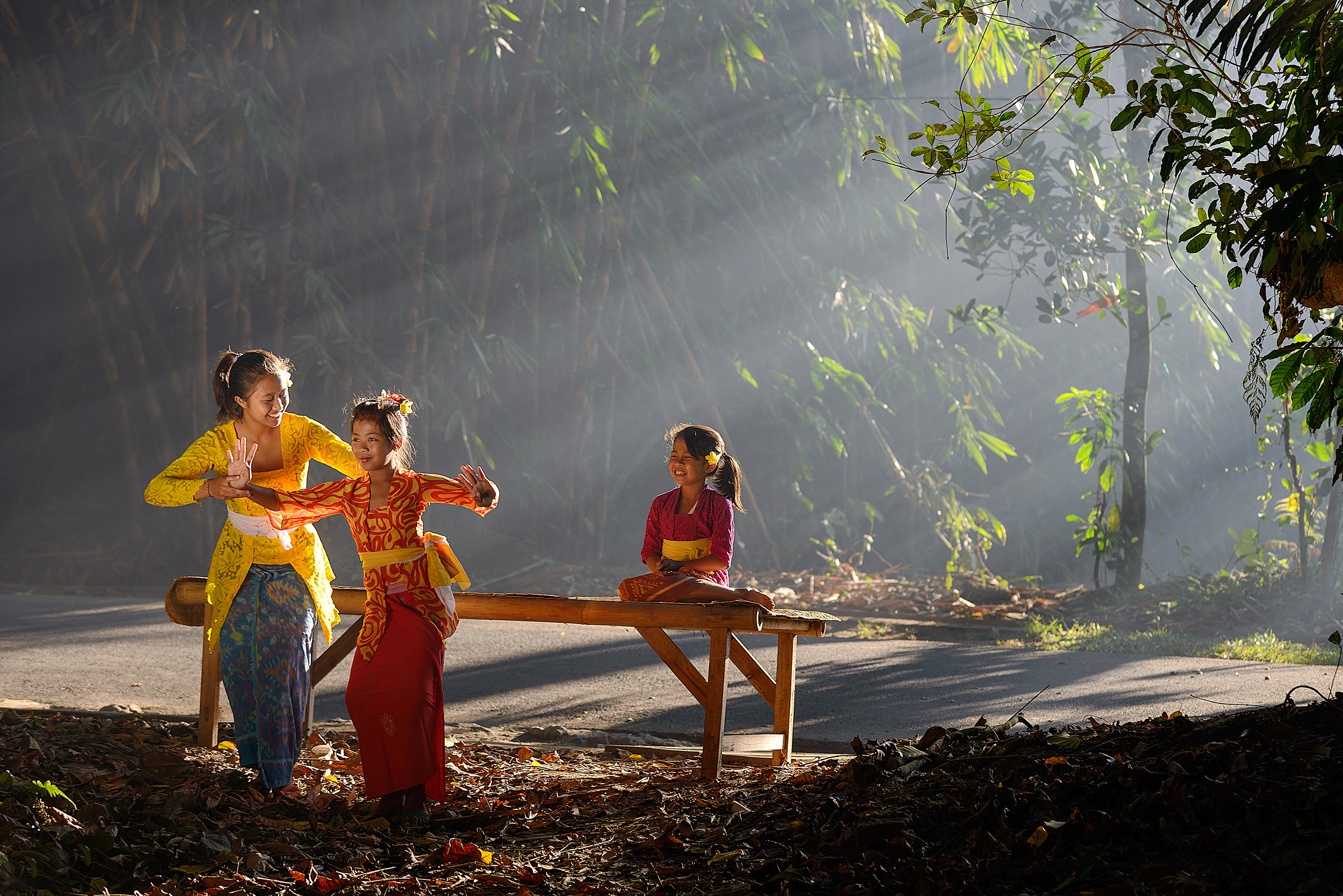
Balinese people have learned to dance since childhood. Balinese dance is a living tradition incorporated within the everyday way of life.

== Gallery ==
Some examples of Balinese Traditional dance

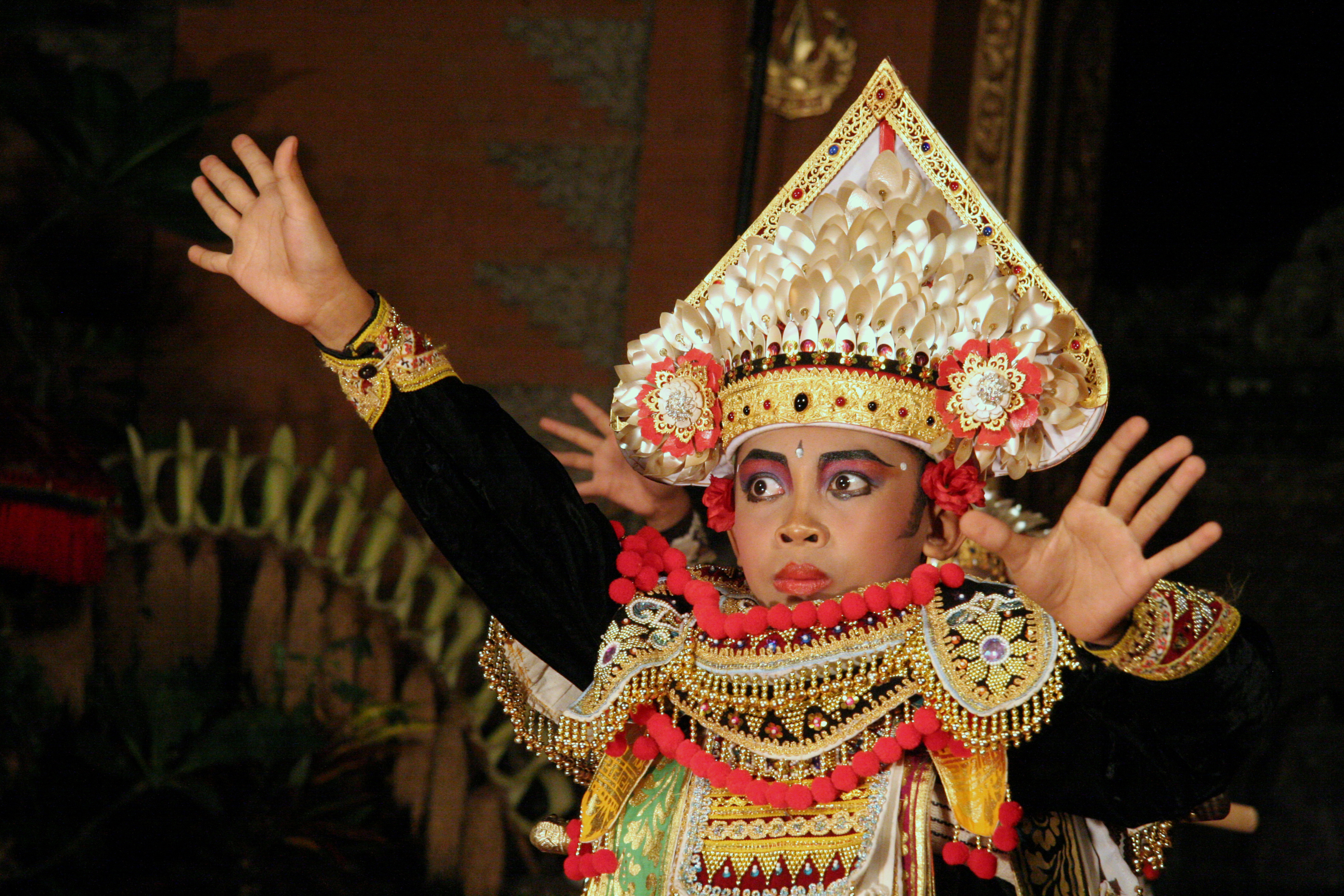
Baris dance

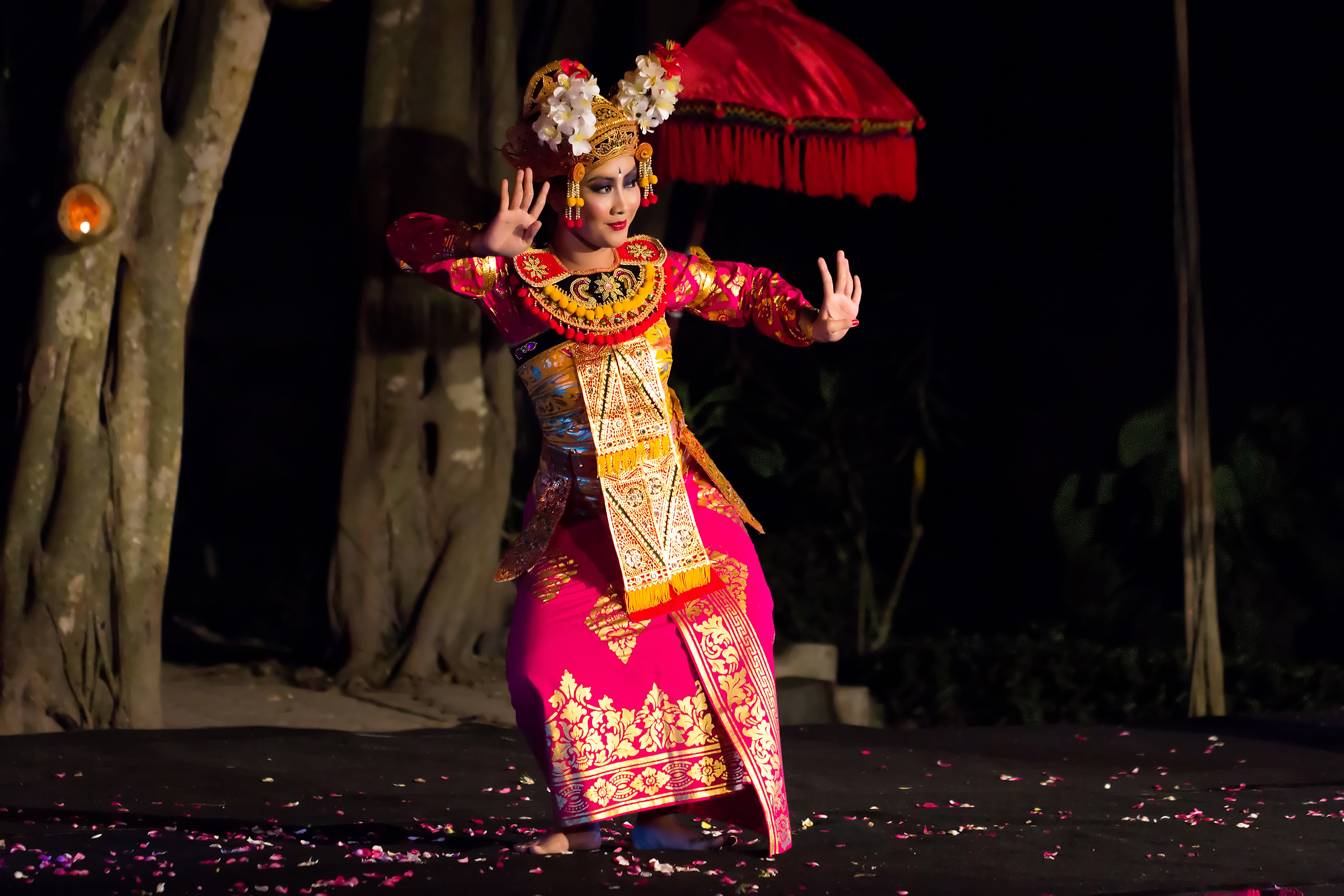
Condong

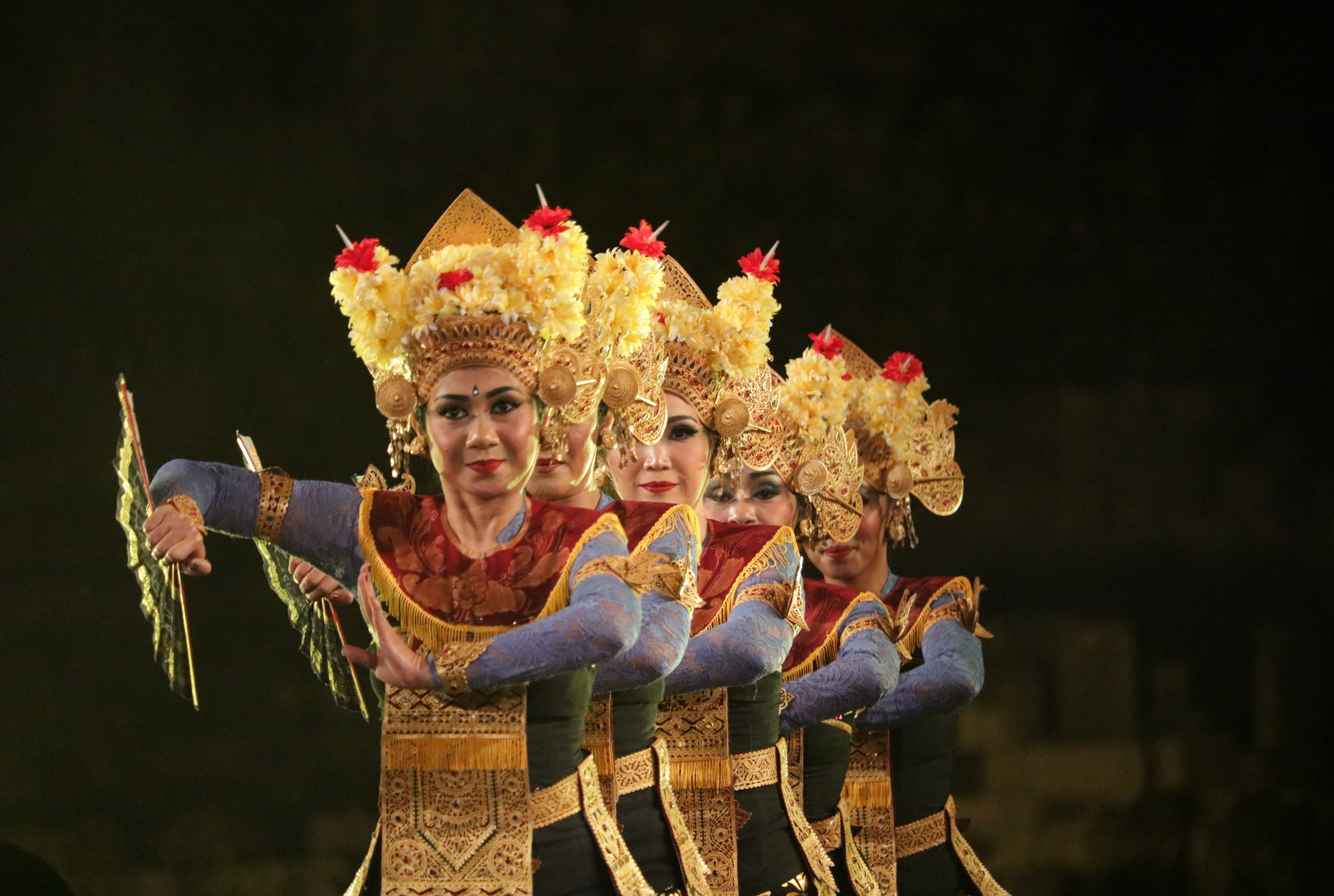
Legong

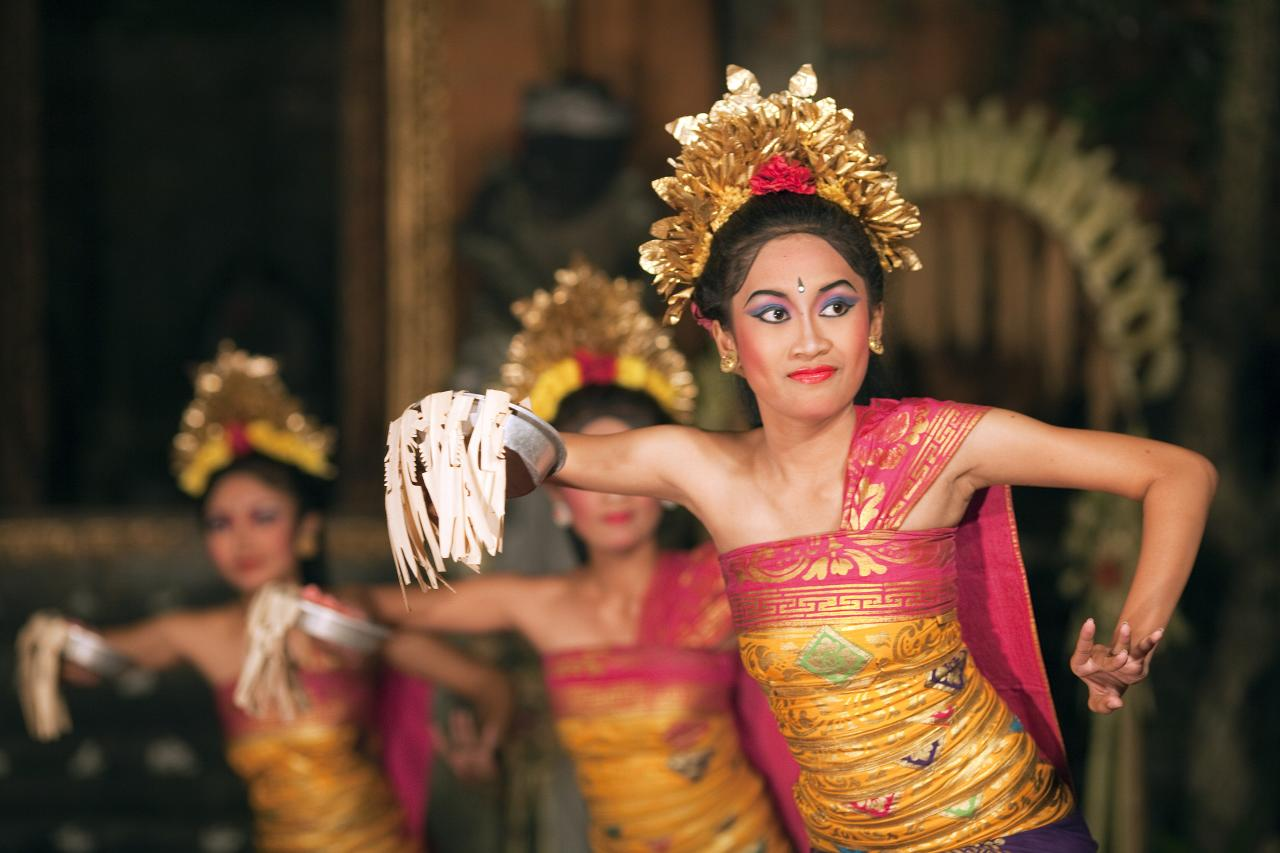
Pendet

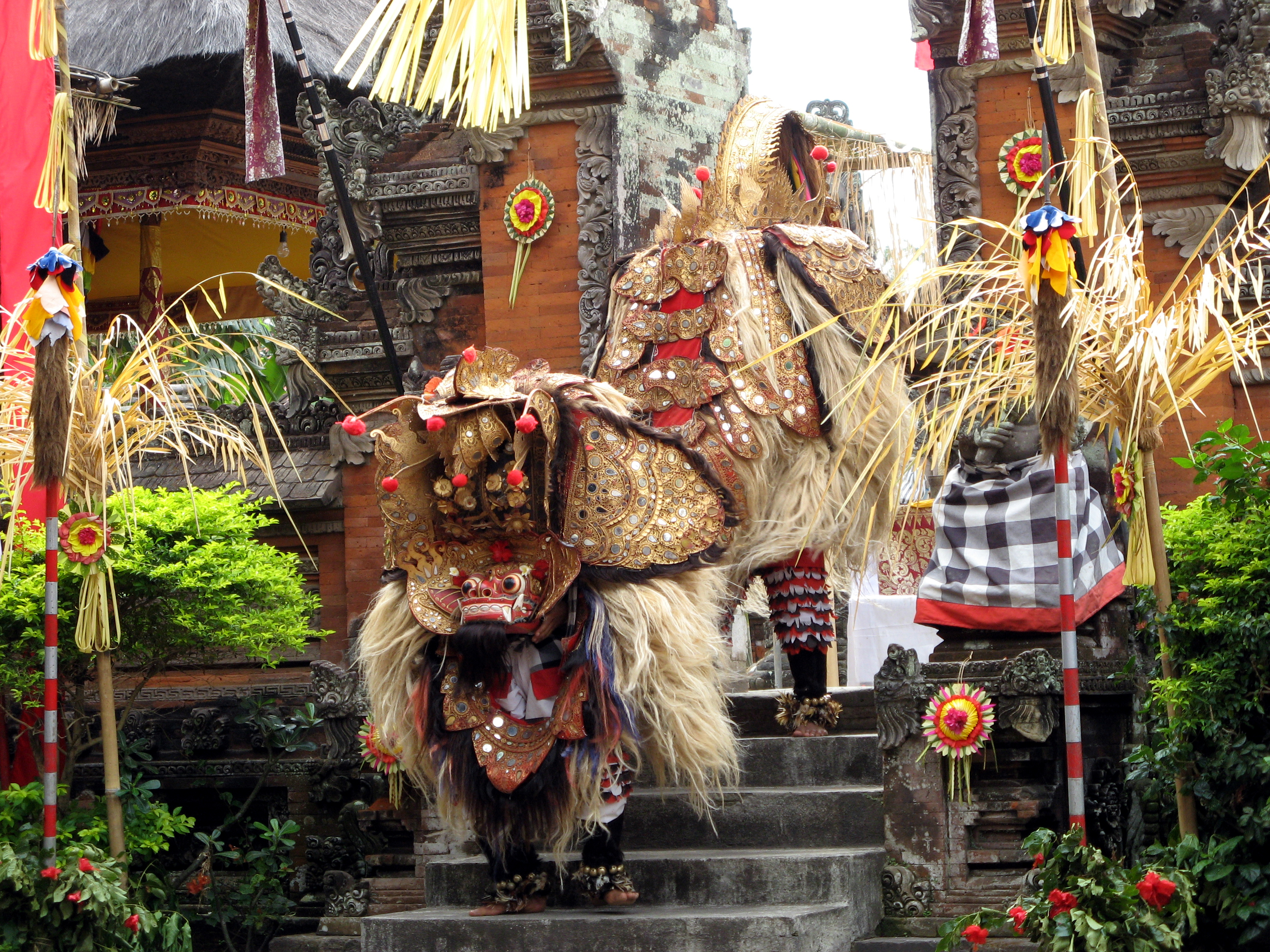
Barong dance

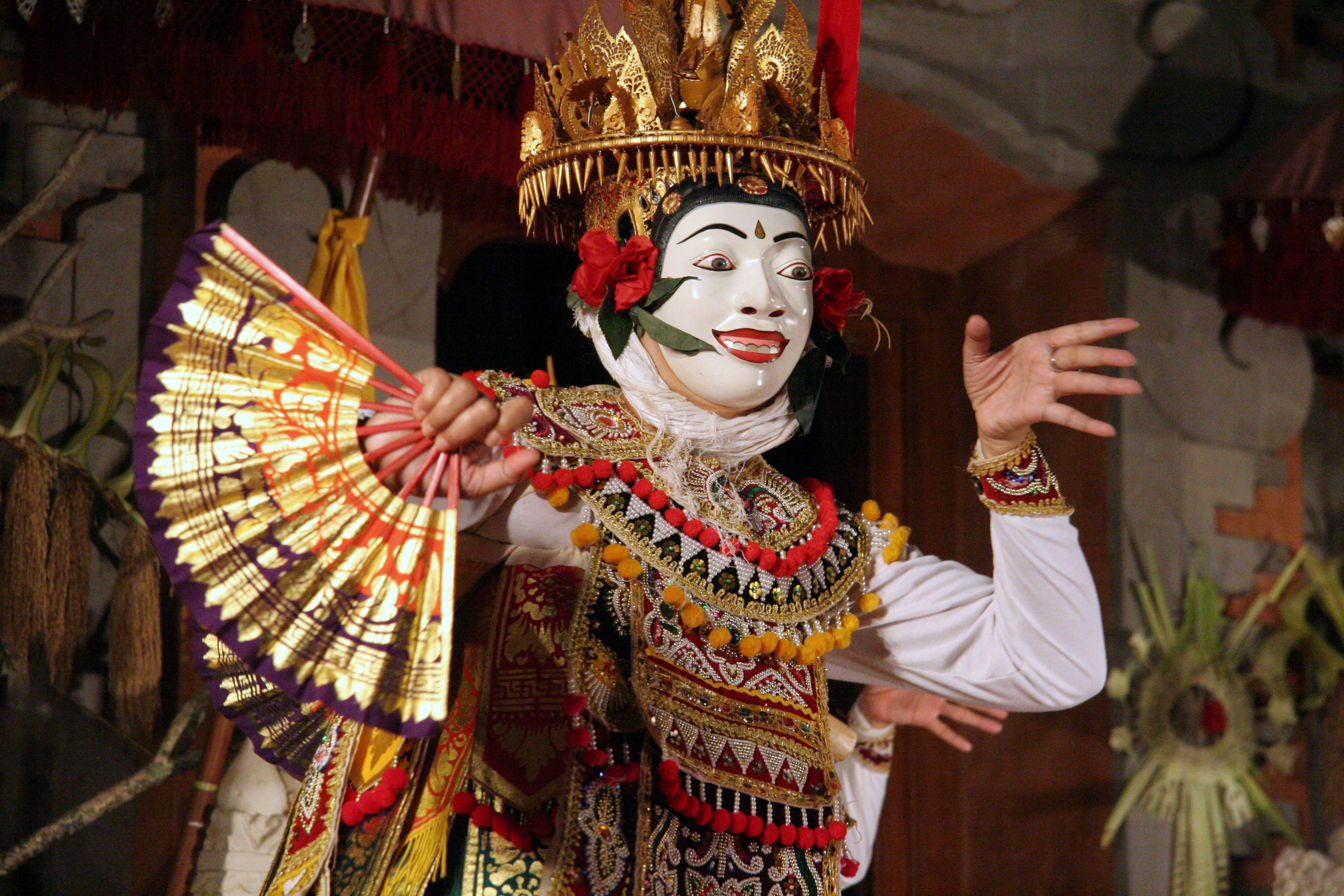
Topeng dance

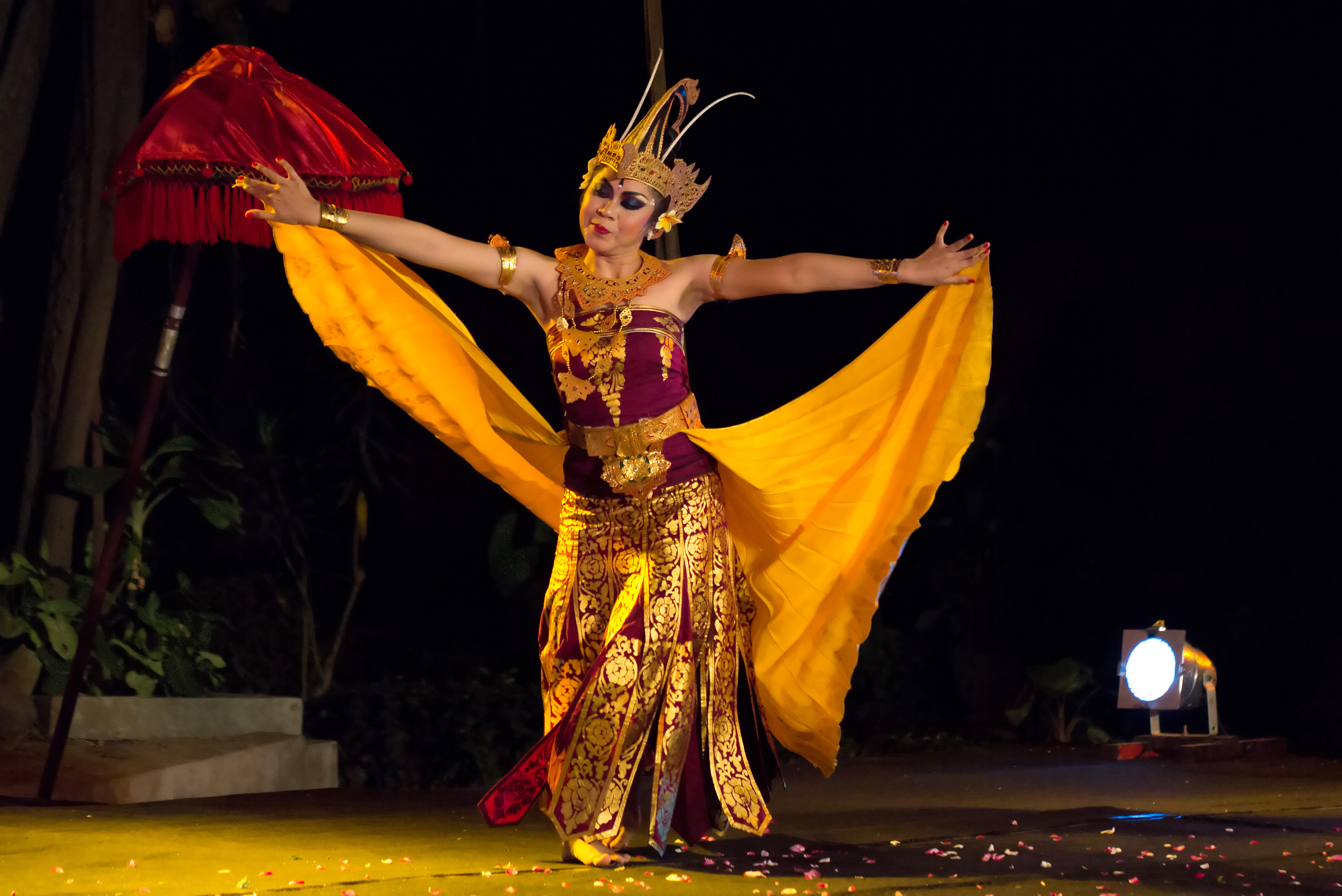
Cendrawasih dance

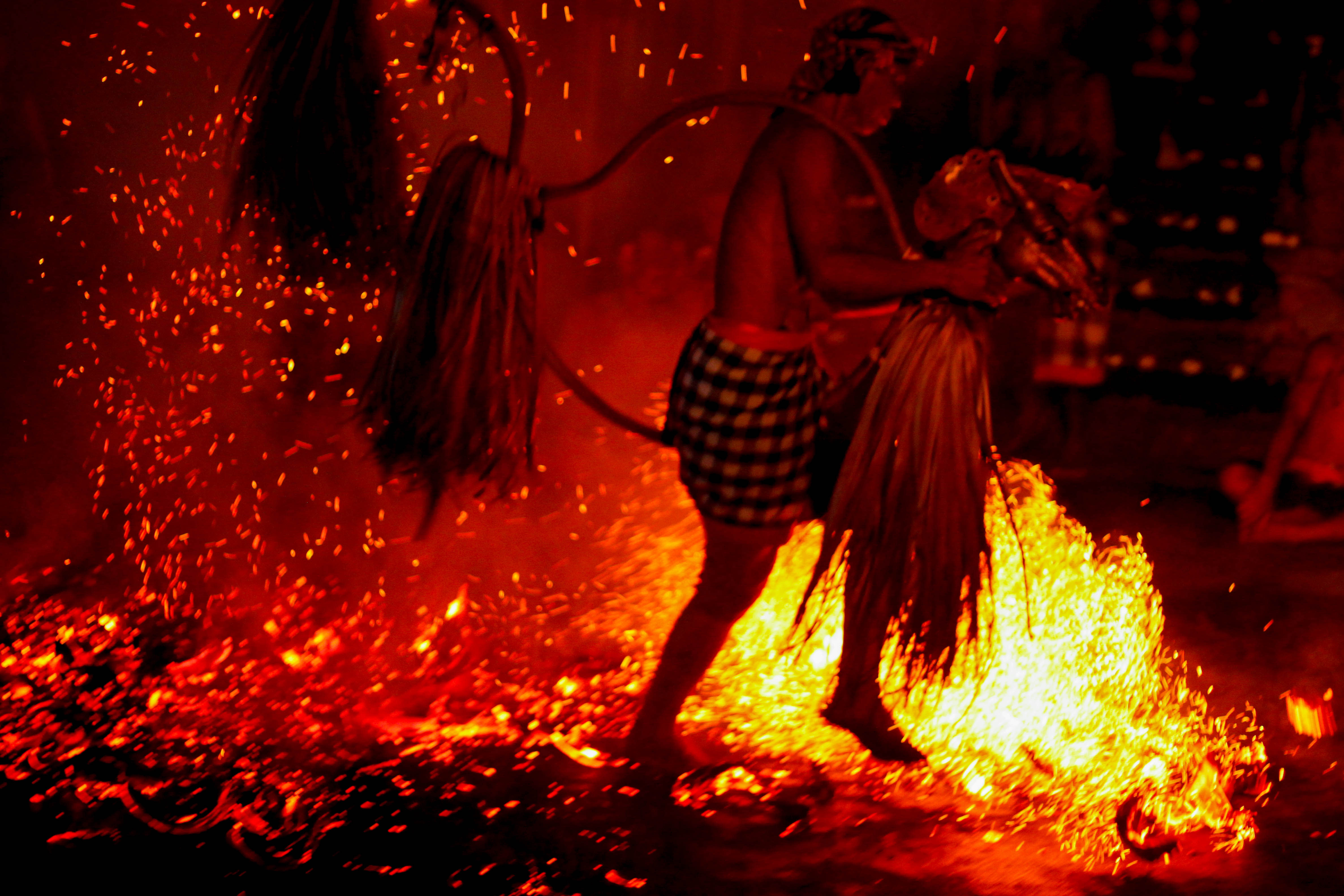
Sanghyang

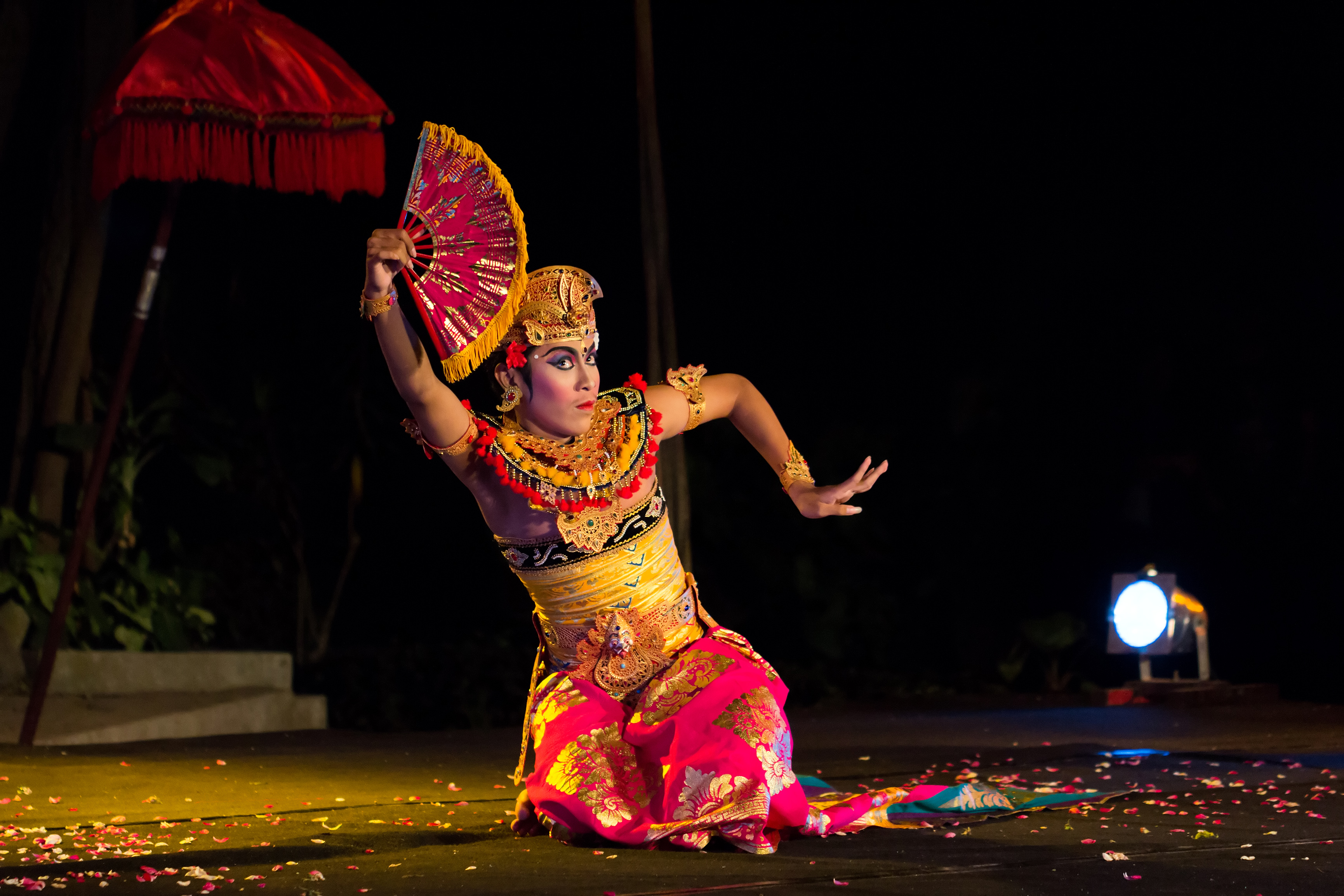
Kebyar duduk

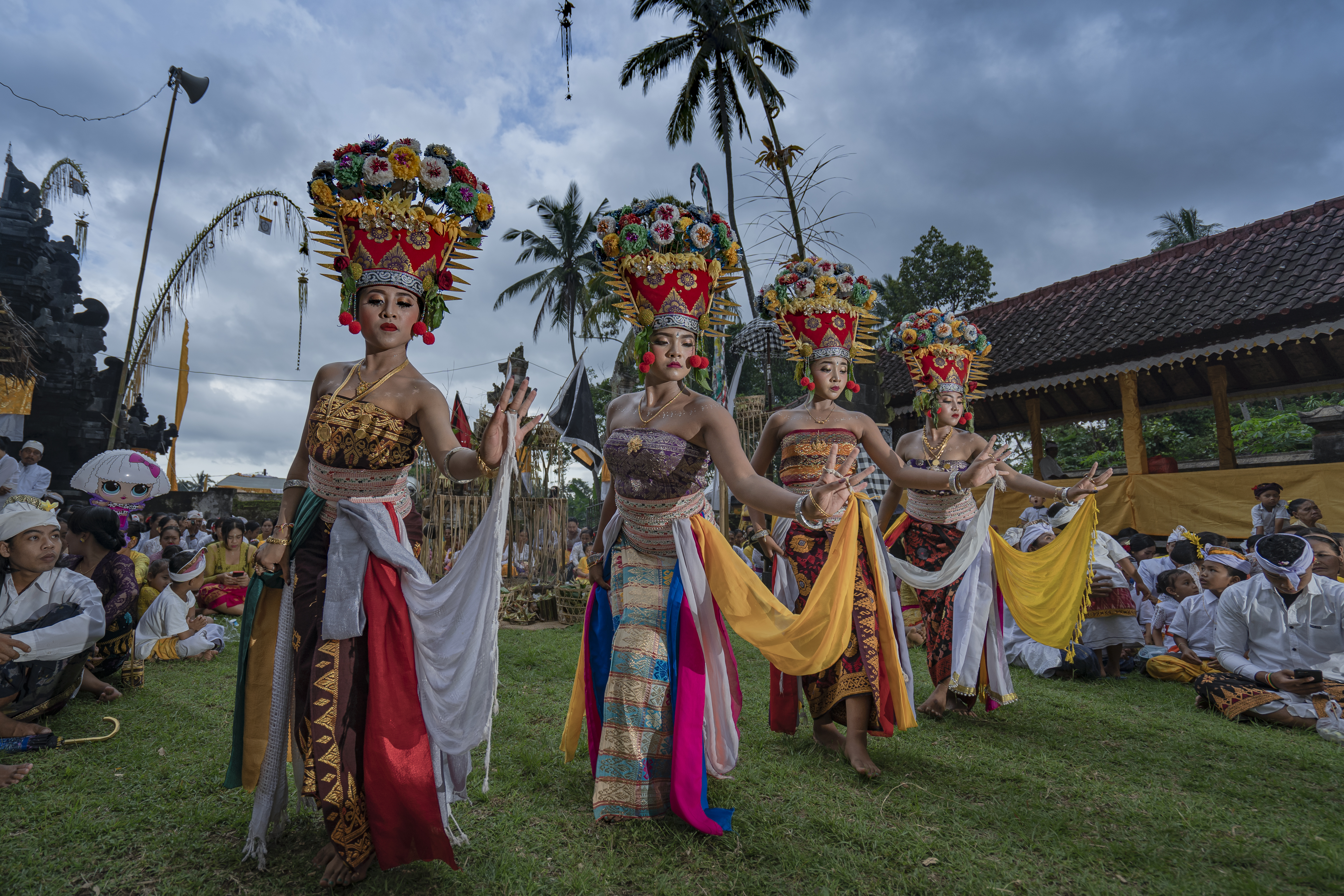
Rejang dance

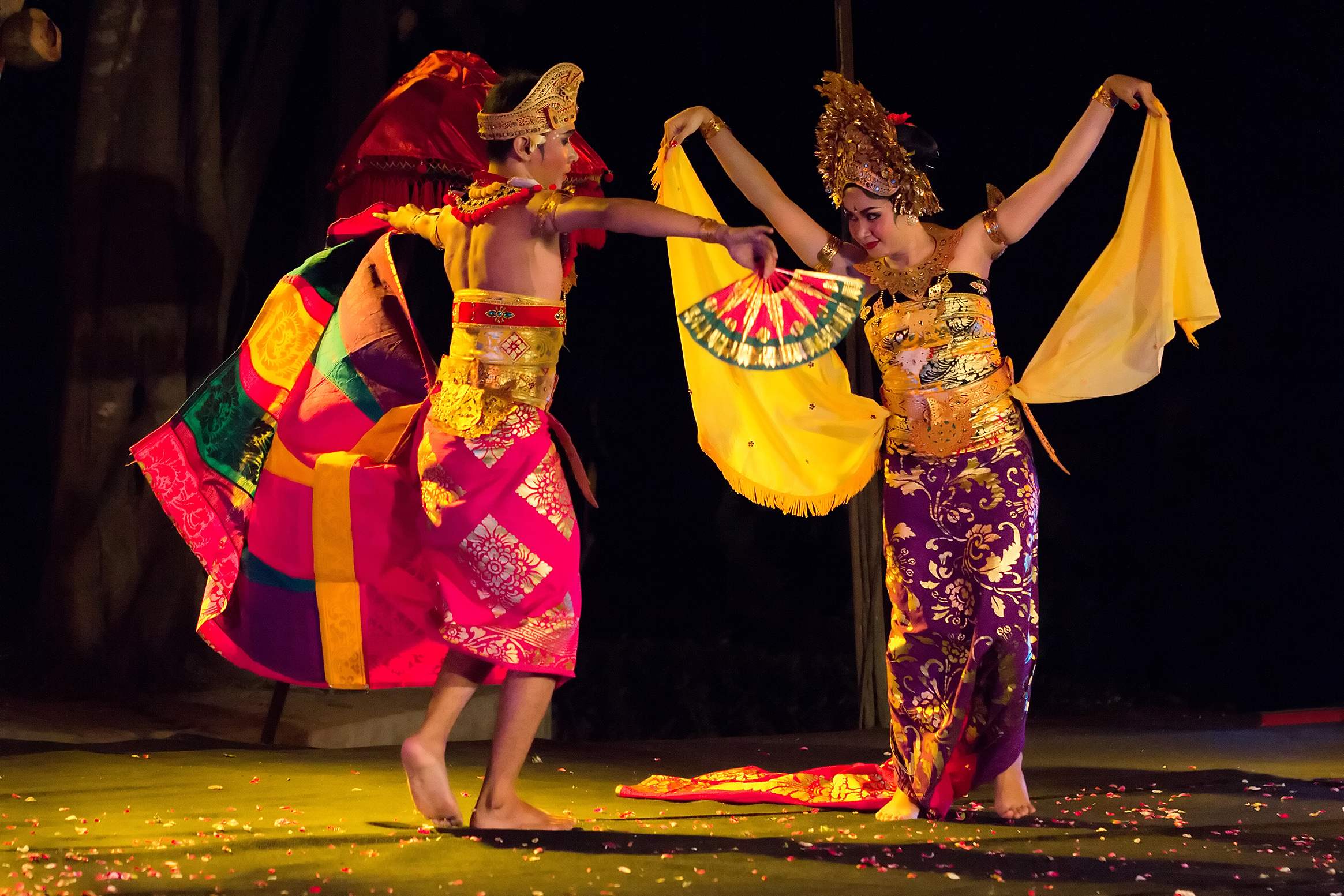
Oleg dance

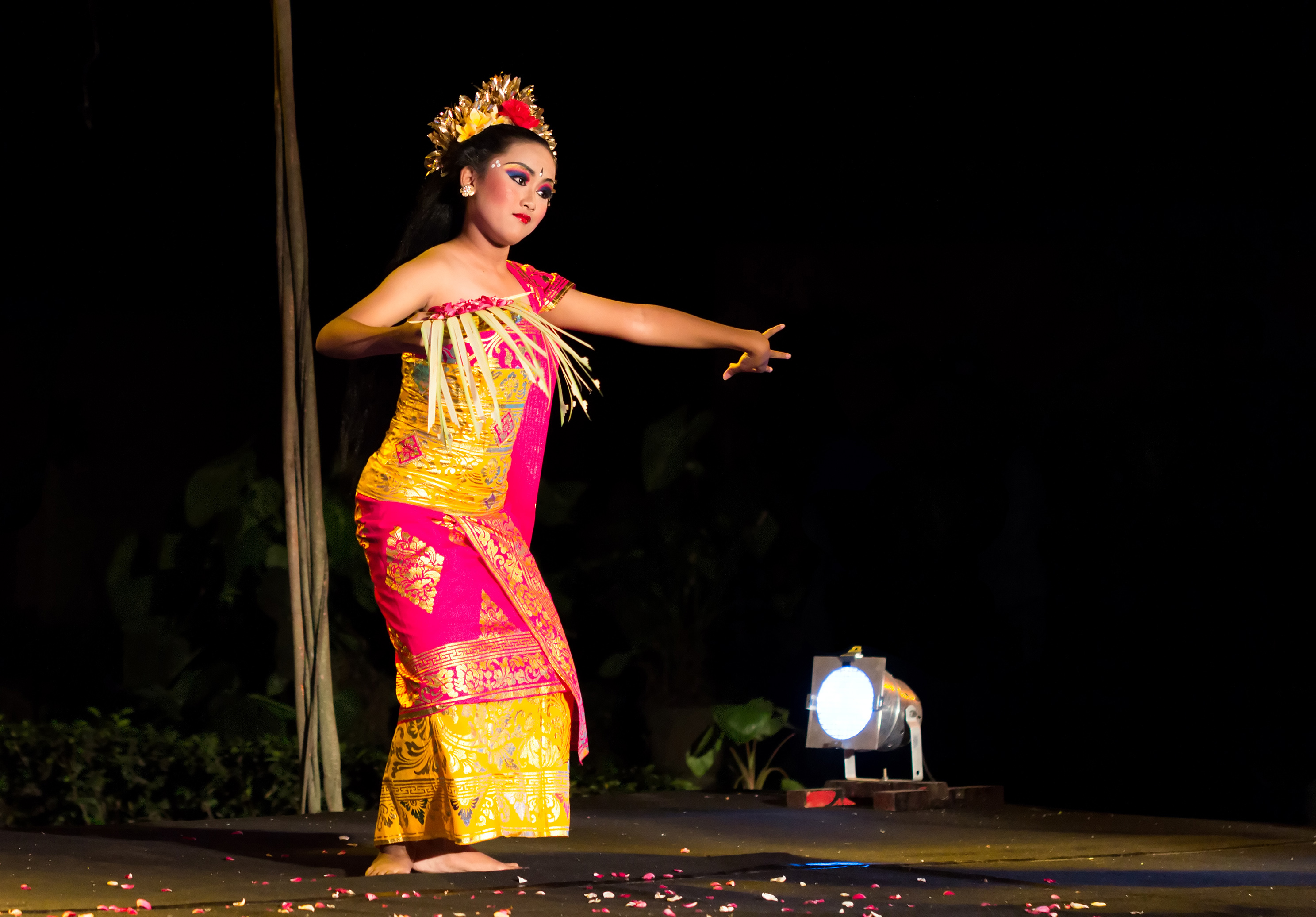
Panyembrama

== See also ==
- Dance in Indonesia
- Javanese dance
- Sundanese dance
- Dance of Cambodia
- Dance of Thailand
- Theatre in Bali
- Hinduism in Bali
- Dance in mythology and religion
- List of basic dance topics
- List of dance style categories
- List of dances
