= Kondon =

Kondon may refer to:

- Kondon, Khabarovsk Krai, a villaɡe in Solnechny District, Russia
- Kondon, Burkina Faso, a village in Niégo Department, Burkina Faso

== See also ==
- Condon (disambiguation)
- Kondom (disambiguation)
