= Condom (disambiguation) =

A condom is a contraceptive device.

Condom may also refer to:

== People ==
- Jean Condom (born 1960), French international rugby union player
- Jordi Condom (born 1969), Spanish association football coach and former player

== Places ==
- Condom, Gers (AKA Condom-en-Armagnac), a commune in the department of Gers (of which it is a subprefecture) in southwestern France
  - Arrondissement of Condom, an arrondissement which contains the commune of Condom
  - Bishop of Condom, a bishopric based in Condom 1317–1801
  - Condom Cathedral, a Catholic church, former cathedral, and national monument of France, located in Condom; formerly the seat of the Bishops of Condom
- Condom-d'Aubrac, a commune in the Aveyron department of southern France

== Other uses ==
- "Condom" (song) by Lady Saw, a pro-condom-use song

== See also ==
- Kondom (disambiguation)
