= Kondom =

Kondom may refer to:

- Teruo Kakuta, pen name Kondom, Japanese manga artist
- Kondom Agaundo, Papua New Guinean tribal leader and politician

== See also ==
- Condom (disambiguation)
- Kondon (disambiguation)
- Kondoma
