= Condom (song) =

Song by Lady Saw
- Songwriter(s): Lady Saw

Condom is a song written in 1996 by Lady Saw. It promoted the use of condoms and how important it is not to judge just by the nature or looks of a person. That everyone should protect themselves with the use of condoms. Lady Saw in the song mentions that you should not let a pretty face stop you from using condoms, and how important women should stand up and make a man use a condom.

== Background ==
In the September 22, 2002 edition of the Jamaica Gleaner Lady Saw explained why she felt she had to make the song.

== Video ==
Shows Lady Saw in a class room teaching adults the importance of condoms.
