= Joged dance =

Indonesian traditional dance

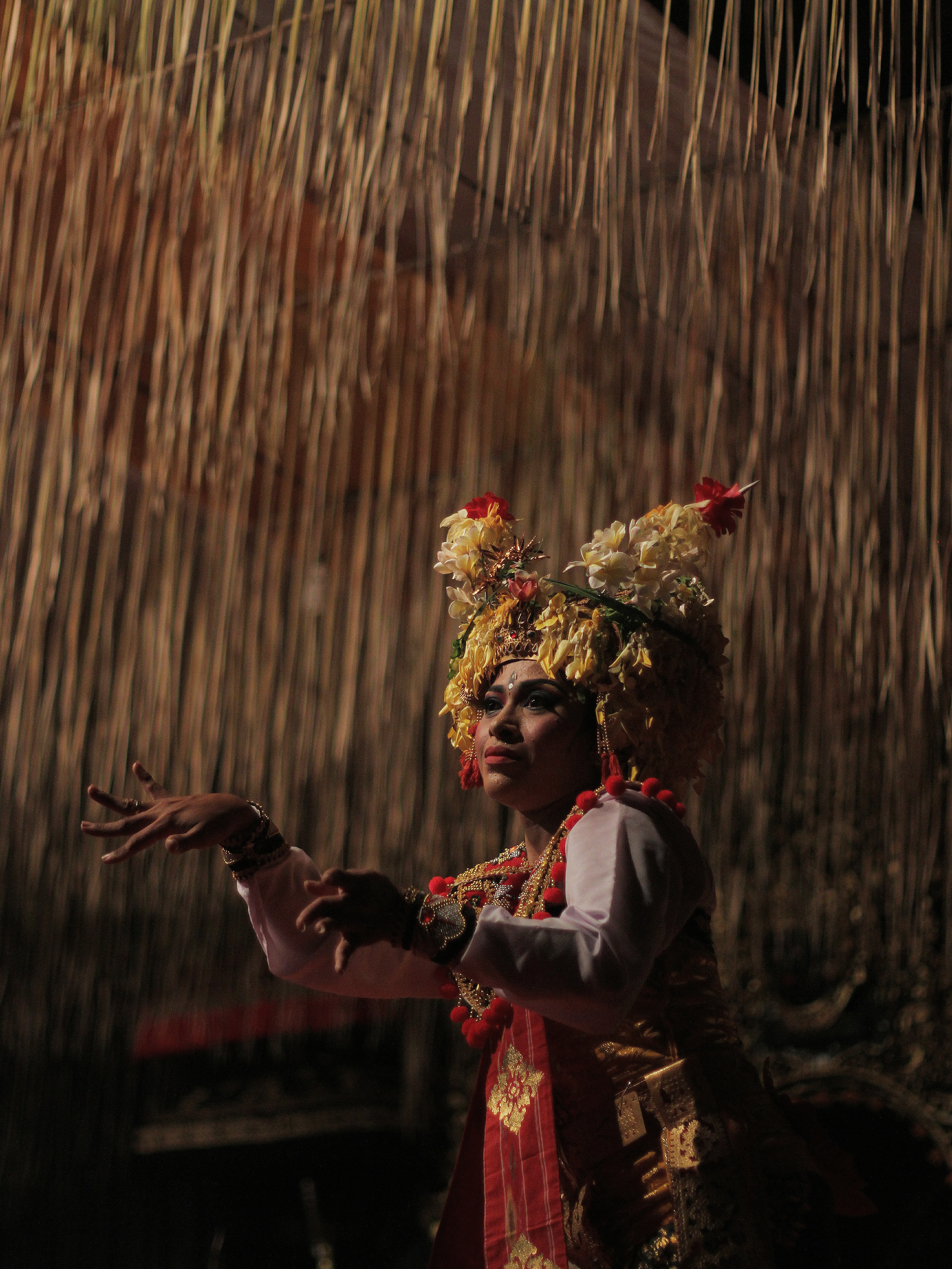
- Joged dance performance
- Native name: ᬚᭀᬕᬾᬤ᭄ (Balinese); Tari Joged (Indonesian)
- Instrument(s): Gamelan
- Inventor: Balinese
- Origin: Indonesia

Three genres of traditional dance in Bali
- UNESCO Intangible Cultural Heritage
- Country: Indonesia
- Reference: 00617
- Region: Asia and the Pacific

Inscription history
- Inscription: 2015 (10th session)
- List: Representative
- Wali Sacred Dances (Rejang, Sanghyang Dedari, Baris Upacara), Bebali Semi sacred Dances (Topeng Sidhakarya/Topeng Pajegan, Gambuh dance drama, Wayang Wong dance drama), Balih-balihan Entertainment Dances (Legong Kraton, Joged Bumbung, Barong Ket)

Joged dance (Balinese: ᬚᭀᬕᬾᬤ᭄) is a style of dance from the Island of Bali derived from the traditional Gandrung dance. The term joged or joget is also a common word for dance in Indonesia. The dance is typically accompanied by a gamelan ensemble of bamboo instruments, called a gamelan joged bumbung. Its dancers usually wear attire consisting of a Kebaya and Sarong. Unlike most Balinese dances, joged is not a religious or ritual one. It is more of a secular social dance for entertainment purposes only. During a joged performance, a single or several female dancers will perform for usually predominantly male audience to dance with them. Dancers may often invite a spectator to join in the joged using a fan and sash. which unlike many dances has no set moves and is largely improvised. It is considered impolite to refuse such an invitation.

The dance often involves movements that are erotic and teasing, showing various interactions between the dancers and their male counterpart, ranging from humorous to seductive. The more provocative nature that this dance can have was called "[incompatible] with the ethics of Balinese culture" by Putu Beratha, head of Bali Province's Cultural Affairs Department, with a youth-led movement Stop Joged Jaruh attempting to remove recordings of the dance from YouTube. In 2016 Governor Made Mangku Pastika attempted to ban the dance, calling it "pornographic". In August 2017, the Bali Provincial Government held a joged bumbung festival to attempt to improve the dance.

The dance is quite comparable with other Indonesian dance traditions, such as those of Javanese ronggeng and Sundanese jaipongan.

== See also ==
- Balinese dance
- Dance in Indonesia
