= Condong =

Indonesian traditional dance

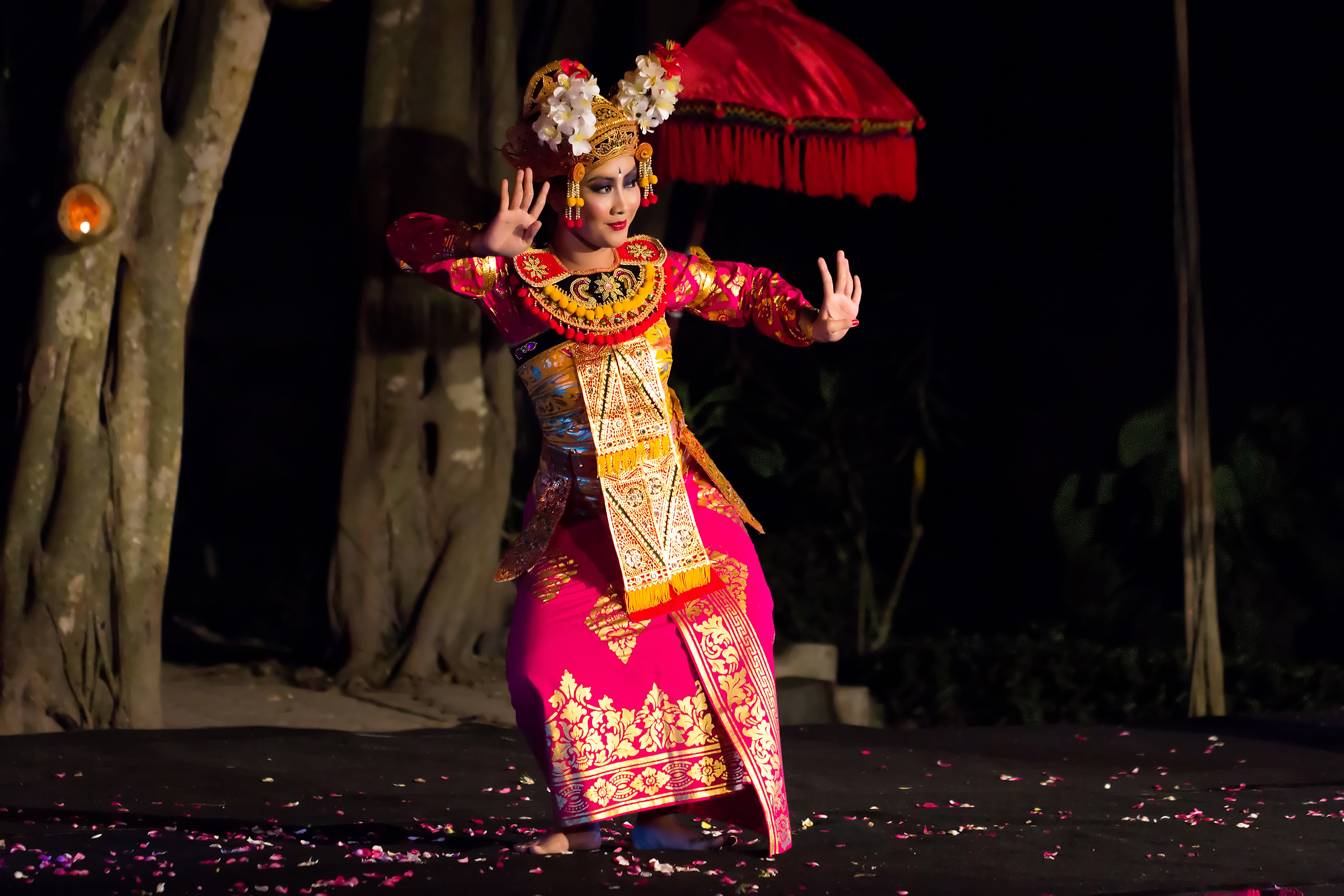
- A Balinese female dancer performed the condong dance in Bali, Indonesia
- Native name: ᬘᭀᬦ᭄ᬤᭀᬂ (Balinese); Tari Condong (Indonesian)
- Instrument(s): Semar pegulingan style of gamelan
- Inventor: Balinese
- Origin: Indonesia

Condong (Balinese: ᬘᭀᬦ᭄ᬤᭀᬂ) is a Balinese dance which is often performed as a preface to legong and accompanied by the semar pangulingan style of gamelan. The term also refers to a stock character, a quintessential representation of the maidservant, found in the condong dance as well as the legong, gambuh, and arja dances.

== History ==
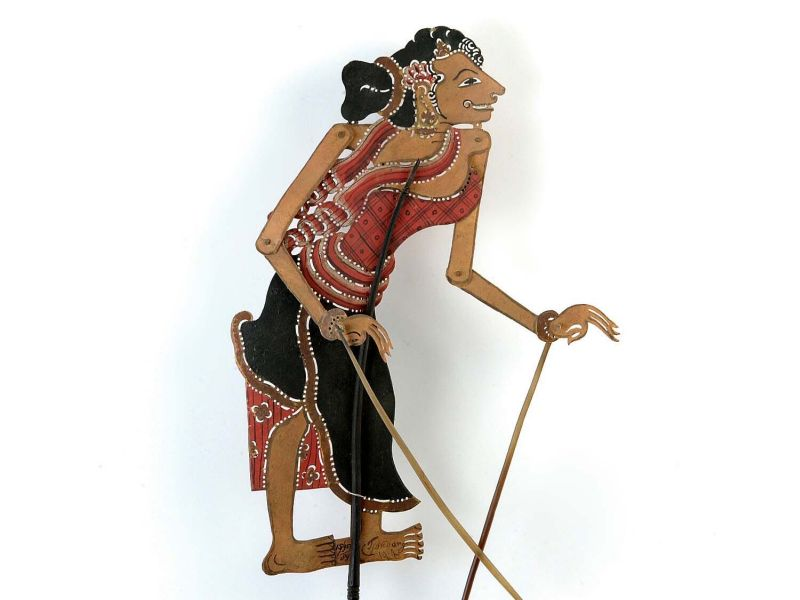
A condong figure in wayang kulit (before 1900)

The condong dance originated in the palaces of Bali in the mid-19th century. Its creator is not known, but folk history suggests that a prince of Sukawati, deathly ill, saw a vision of two beautiful girls dancing gracefully while accompanied by gamelan music; upon regaining his health, this prince recreated the dance he had seen. It originally told the story of two bidadari (nymphs) named Supraba and Wilotama. By the 1930s, the story had been modified, telling of a king or queen and their subject.

In current performances, the condong dancer plays the role of the subject. The choreographer Ni Ketut Arini describes the condong dancer as portraying a palace servant who both serves the king and is in awe of his power and of the beauty of the king's daughter.

Many of the movements are simplified versions of the various legong dances. Hence, condong is considered a basic Balinese dance and is learned by many children.

There have been efforts to preserve the condong dance in Bali. These have included competitions in which children perform the dance for points. Movements from condong have been adapted to more recent creations, including panyembrama (I Wayan Berata; 1971), which also includes legong movements.

== Performance ==
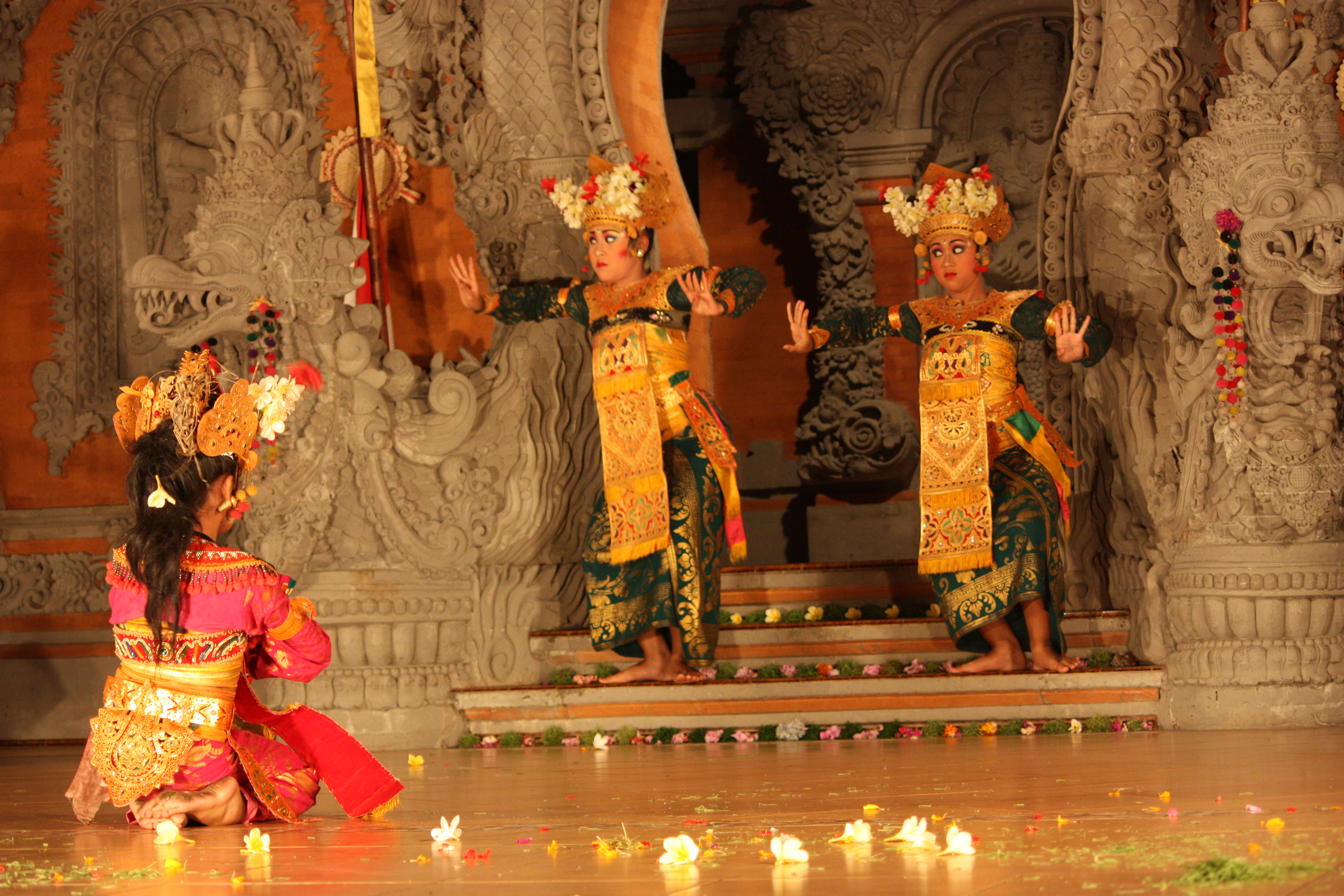
Condong dancer (left) awaiting two legong dancers

Condong is generally used as a preface to the legong dance, and thus performed before it (although it may be dropped). It may also be performed before gambuh or arja dances; the condong character is typical of all of them. The condong character is also consistent throughout different stories, a quintessential representation of the maidservant who has introduced various princess characters, both Balinese and non-Balinese, including Rangkesari, Ophelia, and Miranda.

In dances prefacing legong performances, the condong dancer enters the stage first, and performs her routine. The dancer is generally a young girl, and her movements take what ethnomusicologist Michael Tenzer terms a "sharp and intense" character. When the legong performance proper begins, the condong dancer may dance with the legong dancers, presenting each dancer with a fan before withdrawing. The average length of a condong performance is about 15 minutes. In the legong lasem form, the condong dancer returns with the wings of a raven to foretell the demise of the titular King Lasem.

As with legong dances, condong is accompanied by the semar pangulingan style of gamelan. This musical accompaniment takes the form of a series of short 16-beat melodies, in the gegaboran metre. In the condong dance performed as a preface to legong kraton, the music concludes with a shift to batel metre.

== See also ==
- Legong
- Balinese dance
- Dance in Indonesia

== Works cited ==
- Indriasari, Lusiana (5 January 2013). "Ni Ketut Arini, Menari adalah Pengabdian" [For Ni Ketut Arini, Dance is Devotion]. Kompas (in Indonesian). Archived from the original on 9 November 2014.
- Kusumawati, Utami Diah (23 December 2012). "Tari Legong Condong, yang Klasik dan Antik" [The Legong Condong Dance, Classic and Antique]. Jurnal Nasional (in Indonesian). Archived from the original on 9 November 2014.
- Rubin, Leon; Sedana, I Nyoman (2007). Performance in Bali. Theatres of the world. New York: Routledge. ISBN 978-0-415-33131-9.
- "Tari Condong Dipastikan Lestari di Bali" [The Condong Dance will be Maintained in Bali]. Bali Post (in Indonesian). 12 March 2007. Archived from the original on 25 March 2014.
- Tanjung, Intan (7 October 2012). "Stories within dances". The Jakarta Post. Archived from the original on 9 November 2014.
- Tenzer, Michael (2000). Gamelan Gong Kebyar: The Art of Twentieth-century Balinese Music. Chicago studies in ethnomusicology. Chicago: University of Chicago Press. ISBN 978-0-226-79281-1.
