= Mimi Rasinah =

Indonesian mask dancer

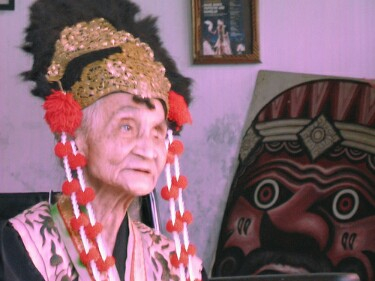
- Rasinah: The Enchanted Mask (2004)
- Born: February 3, 1930; Indramayu, Indonesia
- Died: August 3, 2010 (aged 80); Indramayu, Indonesia
- Known for: Topeng dance

Mimi Rasinah (1930–2010) was a performance artist and dancer best known for her work as a Cirebonese master of the Indonesian mask dance Topeng. At 72, she was called out of retirement to star in an internationally distributed documentary film titled Rasinah: The Enchanted Mask.

== Biography ==
Mimi Rasinah was an 11th-generation Cirebonese dancer born on February 3, 1930, in Indramayu, Indonesia to parents deeply involved in performance themselves. Her father trained her in the art of Topeng beginning at age 5, quickly teaching her the musical arts of gamelan and kendang as well.

In 1942, facing starvation as all nearby food had been contaminated by the Japanese occupation, Rasinah's parents sent her 60 km away to perform in exchange for food that would be safe to eat. While walking home a year later, she was confronted by a Japanese soldier who questioned the young girl about her father's occupation. After telling him that her father was a puppeteer, the soldier followed Rasinah home and destroyed nearly all of the family's collection of heirloom masks, props, and puppets. The occupation had a huge impact on Rasinah's family; her father did not survive the war and her mother fell into a deep depression that she never recovered from. It was around this time that she suffered an injury that resulted in the permanent loss of sight in her left eye.

Mimi Rasinah married twice, eventually settling down with a kendang drummer named Amat with whom she had one daughter.

In 1999, the Japan Foundation Asia Center of the Performing Arts sponsored Rasinah's first performance in Japan. Shortly after, she performed with Didik Nini Thowok in Canada. Rasinah was partially paralyzed by a stroke in 2005 following a dance tour around the UK. Assisted by her granddaughter, Rasinah continued to teach traditional mask dancing from her studio until the end of her life.

Mimi Rasinah died on August 3, 2010, in Indramayu, a day after her final performance from her wheelchair at Bentara Budaya in Jakarta. Her funeral was attended by hundreds of people and featured a parade of performers wearing her many masks and costumes in honor of her dedication to the art. At the time of her death, Mimi Rasinah was the oldest Topeng dancer known to still be performing.

== Rasinah: The Enchanted Mask ==
In the 1990s, Rasinah was contacted by a team of filmmakers and dance scholars seeking a master of Topeng Cirebon to highlight in an ethnographic documentary intended to preserve the dying art form. She had initially retired from performance in 1972, following the loss of both her husband and her front teeth, which are needed to secure the mask to the face. As she no longer considered herself a dancer, the filmmakers had to spend several years convincing the now impoverished Rasinah to participate. They eventually succeeded in bringing her out of retirement by funding the restoration of her family home and dance studio, and purchasing a pair of dentures, and the film was released internationally in 2004. In addition to extensive footage of Mimi Rasinah's interviews and dancing at numerous events, the 54-minute film includes interviews with her friends and family, scholars, locals, and other Topeng artists.

A new short film featuring additional documentary footage of Rasinah titled Forever a Pearl was released by Syaiful Halim in 2016. It was subsequently highlighted by the Golden Frame International Film Festival in Mumbai in 2016.
