= Ireng mask dance =

Indonesian traditional dance

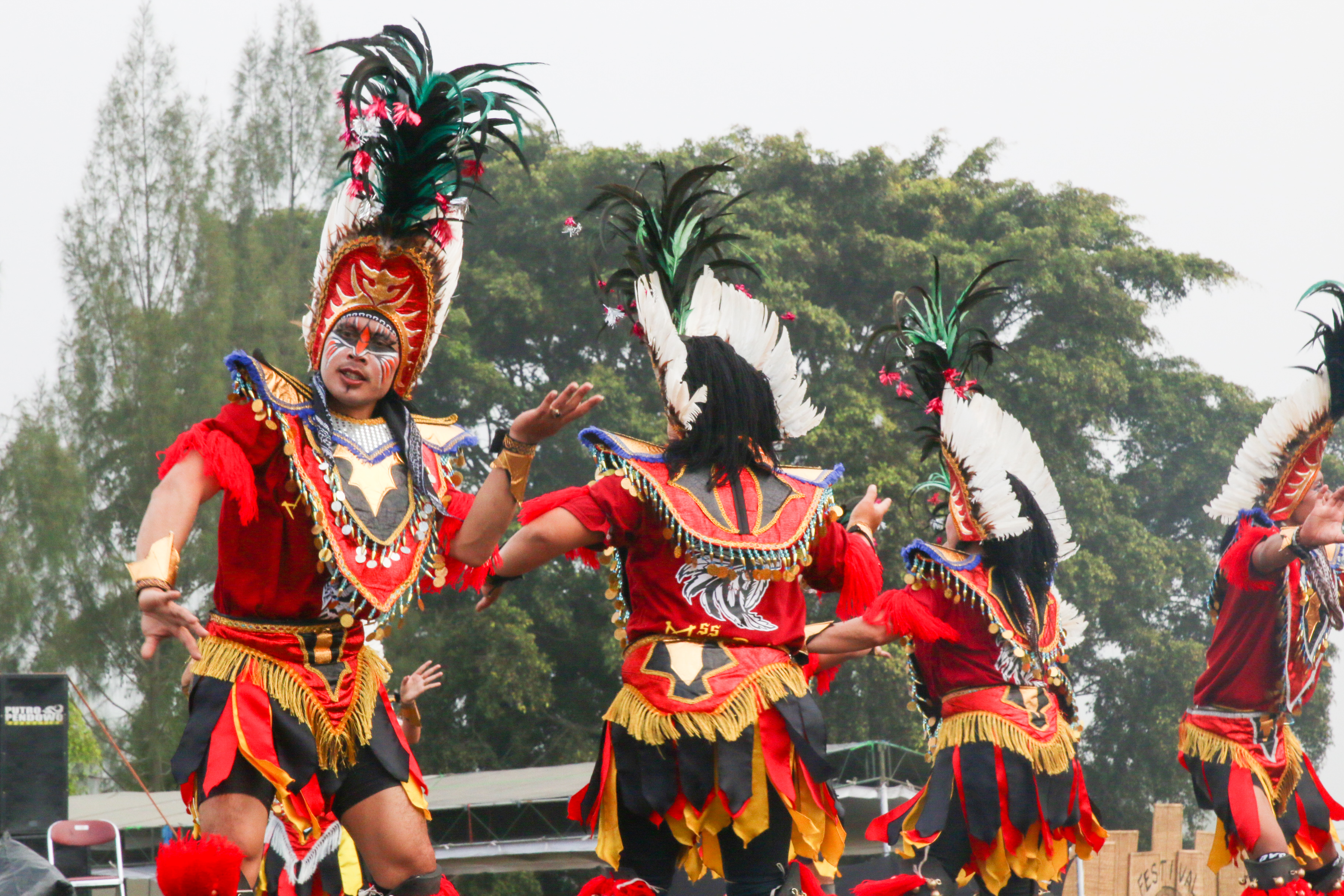
- Ireng Mask Dance performance in Java
- Native name: ꦠꦺꦴꦥꦺꦁꦲꦶꦉꦁ (Javanese); Tari Topeng Ireng (Indonesian)
- Genre: Traditional dance
- Instrument(s): Gamelan, Gong, Kendhang, Suling
- Inventor: Magelang Javanese
- Origin: Magelang (Indonesia)

Ireng mask dance also known as Topeng Ireng or Dayakan (Javanese: ꦠꦺꦴꦥꦺꦁꦲꦶꦉꦁ) is a traditional Javanese art that developed in Magelang Regency, Central Java, Indonesia.

The main attraction of the Ireng mask art lies in the costumes of the dancers, which are almost similar to the Indian tribes in America or the Dayak tribes in Kalimantan. Colorful feather decorations similar to the crowns of Indian chiefs adorn the heads of each dancer. Likewise with the feather crown, the makeup and clothes of the dancers are also like Indian; tufted and full of cheerful colors. Meanwhile, the lower part of the costume, the fringed skirt, is like the Dayak clothing. For footwear, they usually wear gladiator shoes or boots with rolling bracelets, which are almost 200 pieces per player and make a clattering noise with every movement.

Each Ireng mask dance performance will be noisy accompanied by various sounds. Starting from the sound of footsteps that cause a prolonged clatter, the screams of the dancers, the sound of the accompanying music, to the voices of the singers and the audience. Songs in Javanese Salawat / Qasida to dangdut are the characteristics of the accompaniment of this dance performance.

The musical instruments used to accompany Topeng Ireng performances are very simple, such as gamelan, kendang, suling, and tambourine. The rhythmic music created will blend with the movements and screams of the dancers so that the Topeng Ireng performance looks attractive, full of dynamism and religion.

Usually the dancers consist of 10 people or more and form a square or circular formation with body dance movements that are not too complex. The dancers also look very expressive in performing their dances.

== See also ==
- Cirebonese mask dance
- Banjar mask dance
- Betawi mask dance
- Topeng dance
- Javanese dance
- Dance in Indonesia
