= Indonesian 100,000 rupiah note =

Indonesian banknote

One hundred thousand rupiah
- Country: Indonesia
- Value: Rp 100,000
- Width: 151 mm
- Height: 65 mm
- Security features: Security thread, ultraviolet ink, optically variable ink, intaglio printing, plastic coating, watermark, Omron rings
- Material used: Biaxially oriented polypropylene (1999-2004); Cotton paper (2004-present)
- Years of printing: 1999-present (modified 2004, 2011, 2014, 2016, 2022)

Obverse
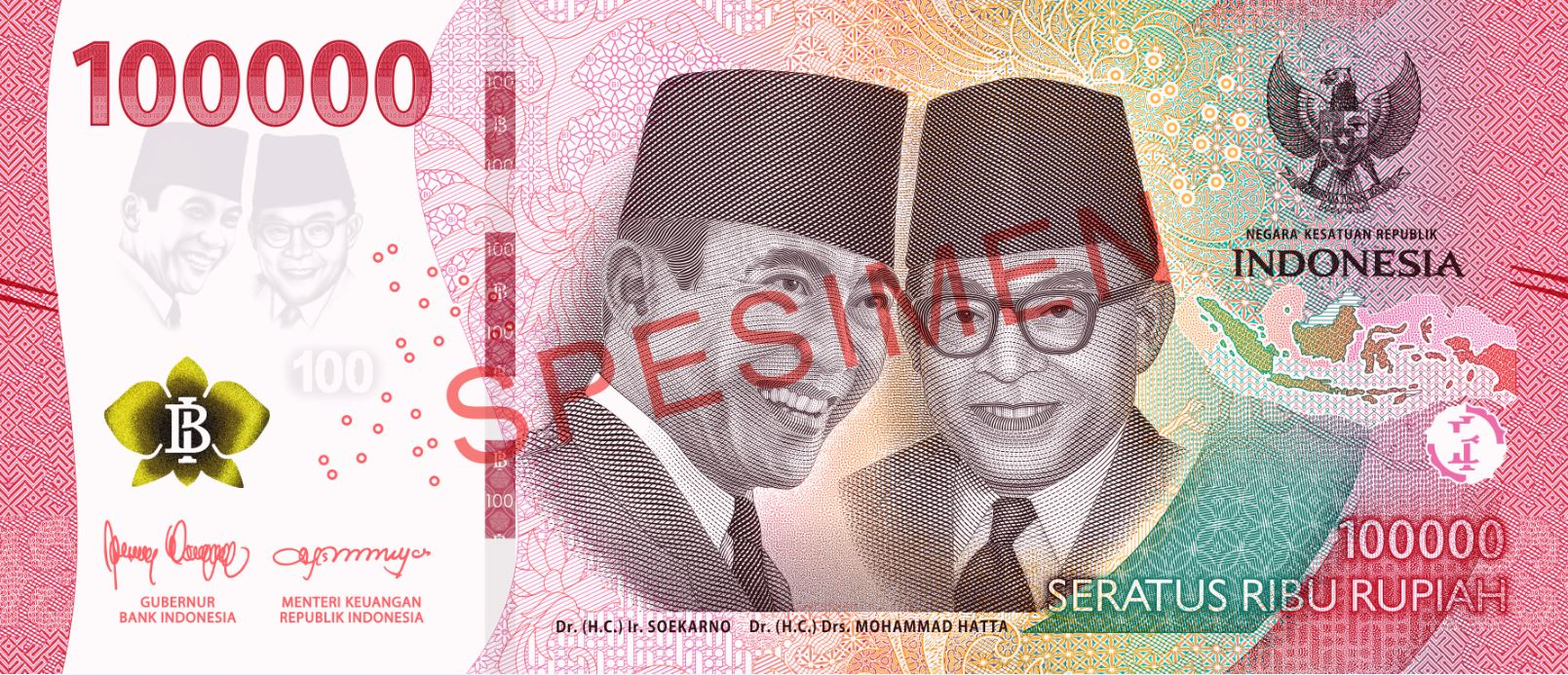
- Design: President (H.C.) Ir. Soekarno and Vice President (H.C.) Drs. Mohammad Hatta
- Designer: Bank of Indonesia
- Design date: 2022

Reverse
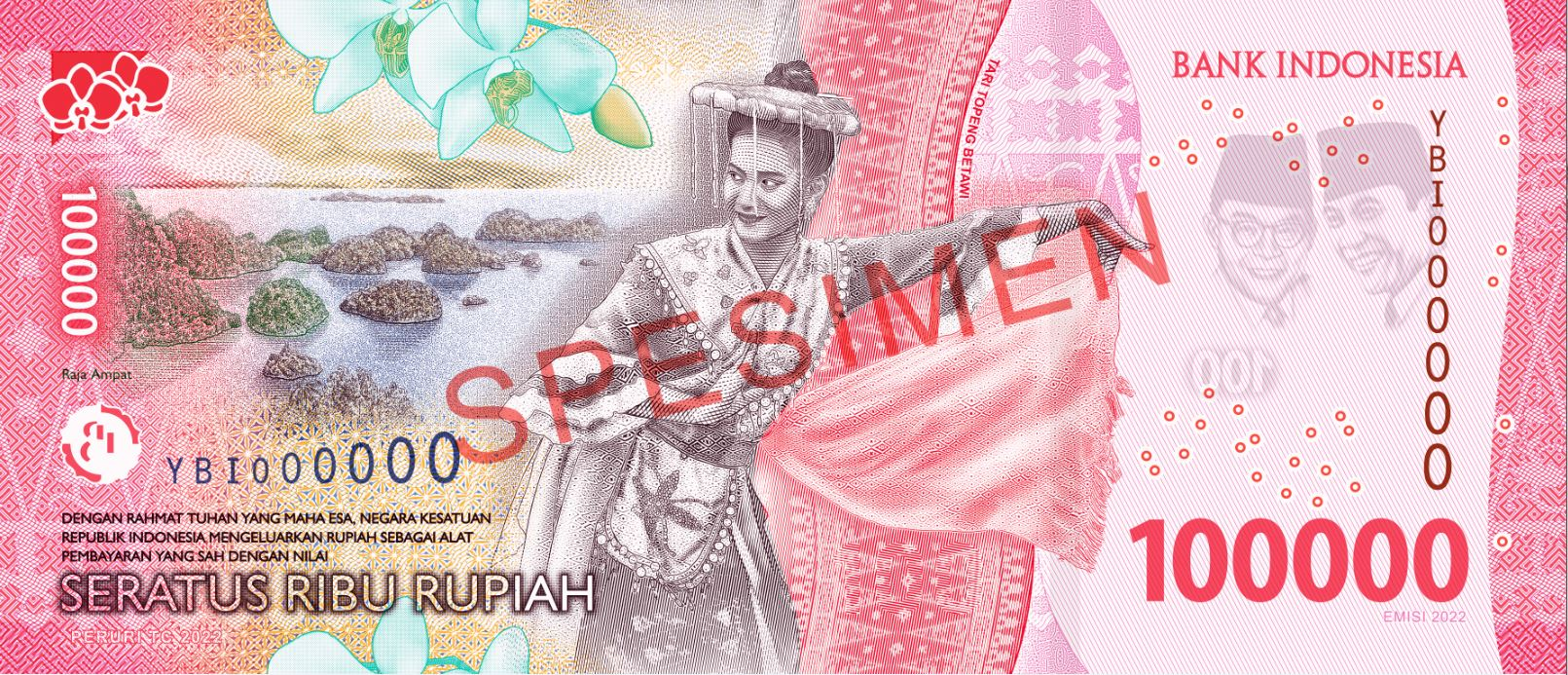
- Design: Raja Ampat, Betawi mask dance, and moon orchid
- Designer: Bank of Indonesia
- Design date: 2022

The Indonesian one hundred thousand rupiah banknote (Rp100,000) is a denomination of the Indonesian rupiah. Being the highest and second-newest denomination of the rupiah (after the Rp2,000 note), it was first introduced on 1 November 1999, as a polymer banknote before switching to cotton paper in 2004; all notes have been printed using the latter ever since.

== 1999 issue ==
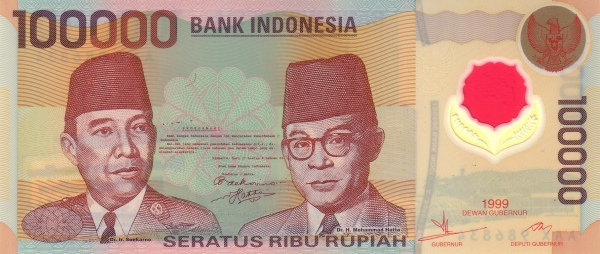
Obverse of 1999 issue

Reverse of 1999 issue

To anticipate the Year 2000 problem, then-Senior Deputy Governor of Bank Indonesia Mirza Adityaswara predicted an increase of demand in money. To address this, Bank Indonesia imported 500 million polymer notes of this denomination from Note Printing Australia. This note had a size of 153 mm × 65 mm (6.0 in × 2.6 in) and featured President Sukarno and Vice President Hatta as well as the Proclamation text on its obverse and the Parliament Building in Jakarta on its reverse. Its security features consisted of a watermark of the national emblem Garuda Pancasila on its right-hand side, a hologram of the BI's logo, a transparent window, raised printing, and a UV ink image ("100000" in a rectangle) on its reverse. This banknote was demonetised on 31 December 2008, and was exchangeable in commercial banks until 30 December 2013, and in Bank Indonesia offices until 31 December 2018.

It is one of the only two Indonesian polymer banknotes, the other being the 1993-dated Rp50,000 note featuring President Suharto and his societal achievements on its obverse and the Soekarno-Hatta International Airport with a Garuda Indonesia Boeing 747-400 taking off on its reverse.

== 2004 issue ==
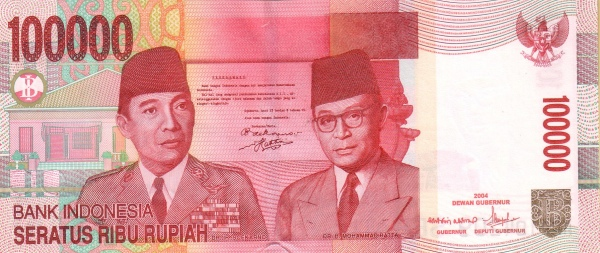
Obverse of 2004 issue

Reverse of 2004 issue

On 29 December 2004, Bank Indonesia released a redesigned 100,000 rupiah note. Now printed using imported paper, it was predominantly red (instead of being multicoloured like the 1999 series) and featured additional advanced security features than the previous series, such as an asymmetrical serial number, a thicker security thread, a see-through image, the usage of optically variable ink and Irisafe, and a raised print on the lower right to accommodate the blind. Its obverse and reverse remained the same with the exception of an additional depiction of Sukarno's house at Jalan Pegangsaan Timur no. 56 on its obverse and its watermark now depicting Wage Rudolf Supratman (1903-1938).

== 2011 issue ==
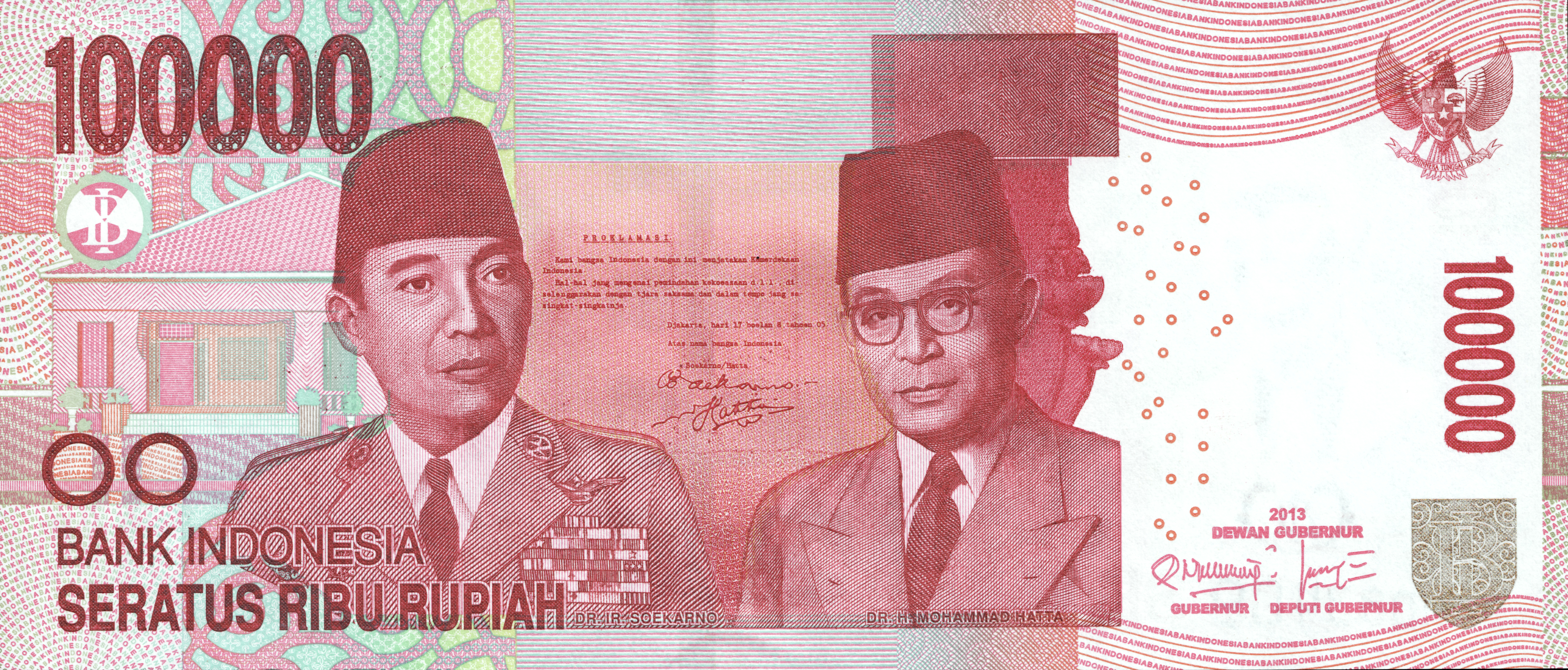
Obverse of 2011 issue

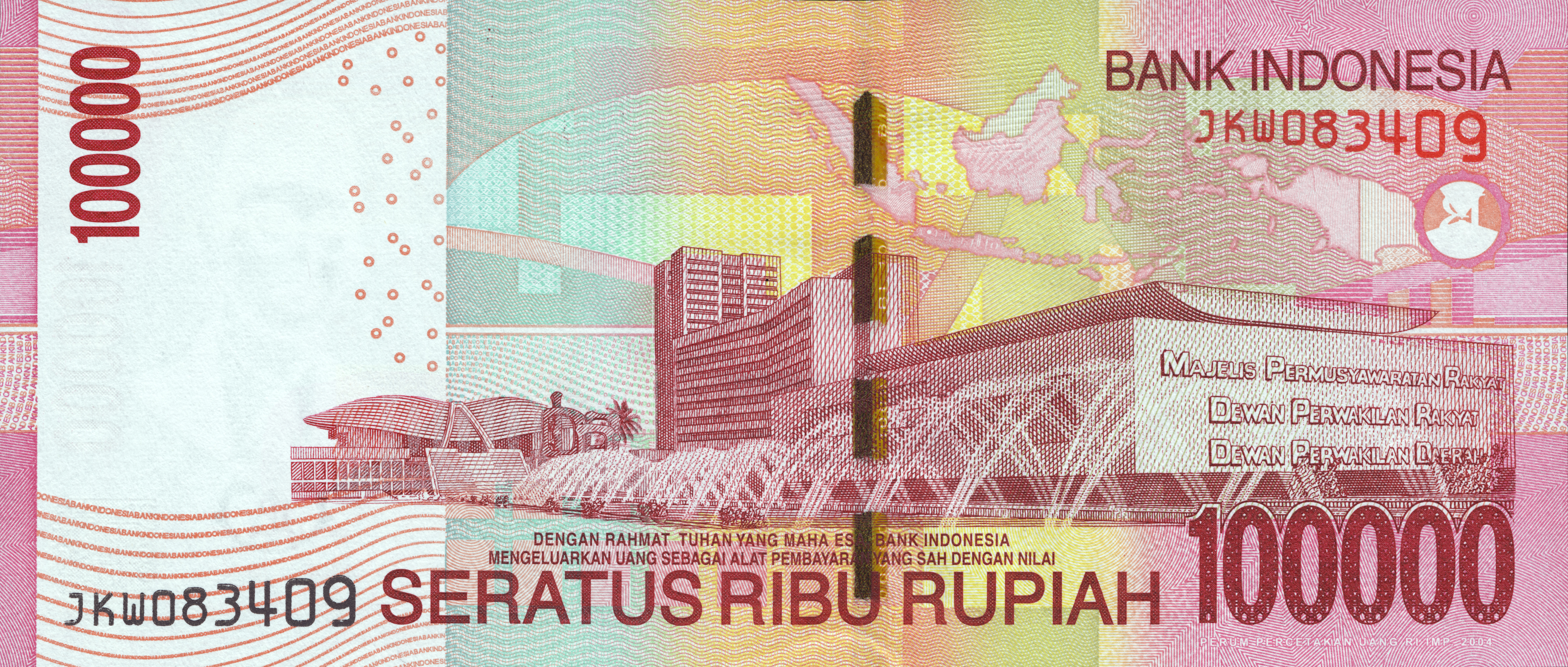
Reverse of 2011 issue

A minor design update in 2011 added rainbow printing, Omron rings, two intaglio-printed circles on the lower left as a new blind code, and removed the Irisafe previously present on the right side of the note.The parliament building also featured the lettering "DEWAN PERWAKILAN DAERAH" as part of the update. Banknotes of this type were first released on 31 October 2011.

== 2014 issue ==
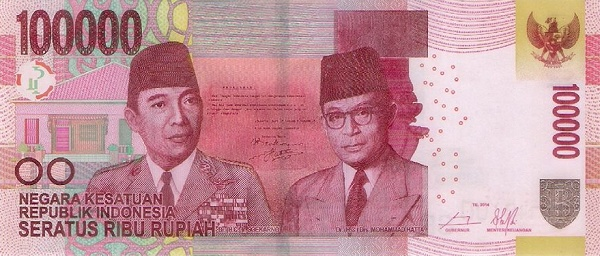
Obverse of 2014 issue

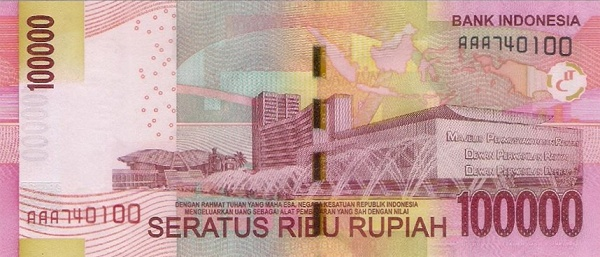
Reverse of 2014 issue

To commemorate the 69th anniversary of Indonesian independence on 17 August 2014, Bank Indonesia updated the Rp100,000 note so that it featured the phrase "NEGARA KESATUAN REPUBLIK INDONESIA" (instead of "BANK INDONESIA" used in the 2004 and 2011 series), a different see-through image, different titles for President Sukarno and Vice President Hatta in accordance to a Presidential Regulation, additions of colour blocks, a colour change of the serial number on the lower left of the reverse to red, and a reduced "BANK INDONESIA" lettering size on the upper right of the reverse.

== 2016 issue ==
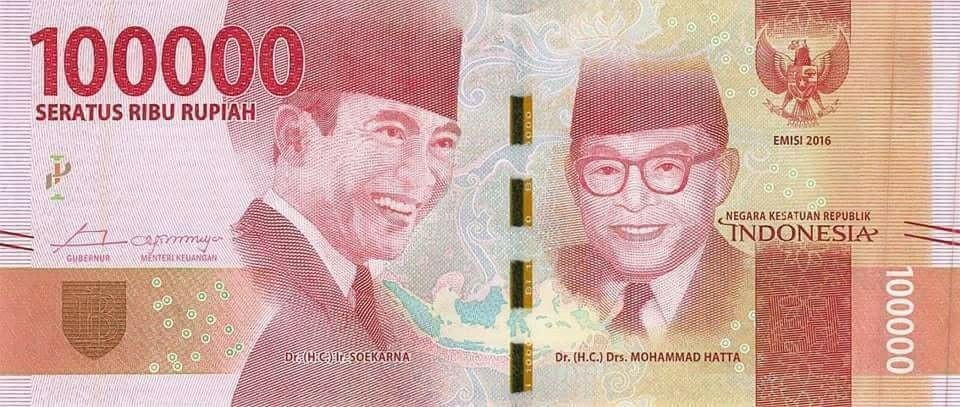
Obverse of 2016 issue

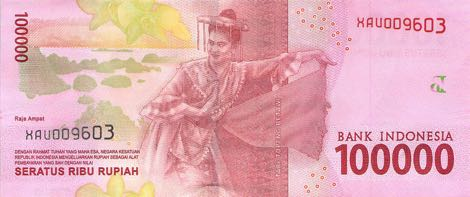
Reverse of 2016 issue

This note went through a major redesign on 19 December 2016 so that its obverse featured an updated image of the President and Vice President and its reverse featured depictions of a Topeng Betawi dance, the Raja Ampat Islands at Irian Jaya, and a moon orchid. Its security features include the watermark of Wage Rudolf Supratman (1903-1938), microprinting, intaglio print, a see-through image of the BI's logo, a latent image, optically variable and ultraviolet inks, and a see-through register. Bank Indonesia predicts that all notes of this series will be withdrawn by 2026.

== 2022 issue ==
This note was updated to its current design on 17 August 2022, to commemorate Indonesia's 77th independence anniversary. Its design and security features remained the same as the 2016 series with the only differences being the watermark, which is updated to feature both President Sukarno and Vice President Hatta (instead of the 2016 series' Wage Rudolf Supratman) and the colour motif, which is improvised to multicolored (as opposed to the previous series' monochrome style). This note also contains magnetic ink with dynamic image movement.

== See also ==
- Indonesian rupiah
- Banknotes of the rupiah
