= Indonesian 2,000 rupiah note =

Indonesian banknote

Two thousand rupiah
- Country: Indonesia
- Value: Rp 2,000
- Width: 126 mm
- Height: 65 mm
- Weight: 90 g
- Security features: Security thread, ultraviolet ink, intaglio printing, plastic coating, watermark
- Material used: Cotton paper
- Years of printing: 2009-present (modified 2016, 2022)

Obverse
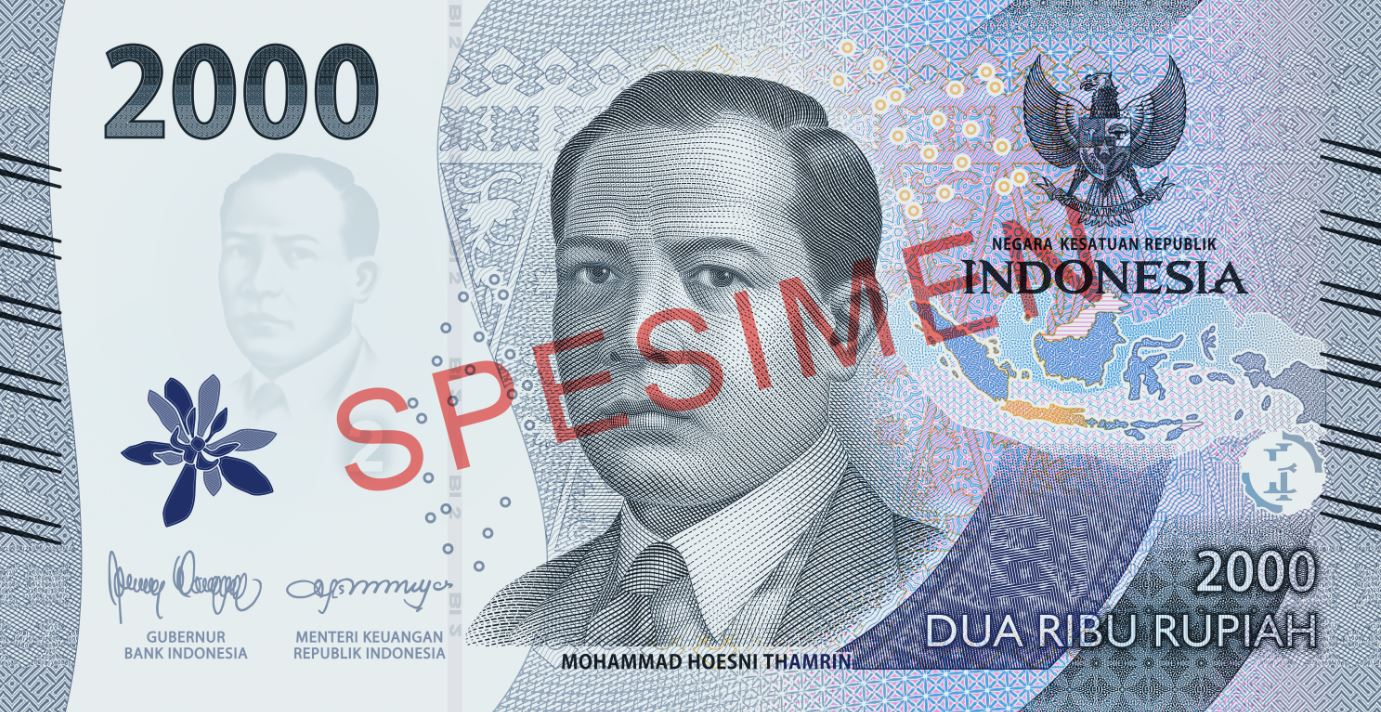
- Design: Mohammad Husni Thamrin
- Designer: Bank of Indonesia
- Design date: 2022

Reverse
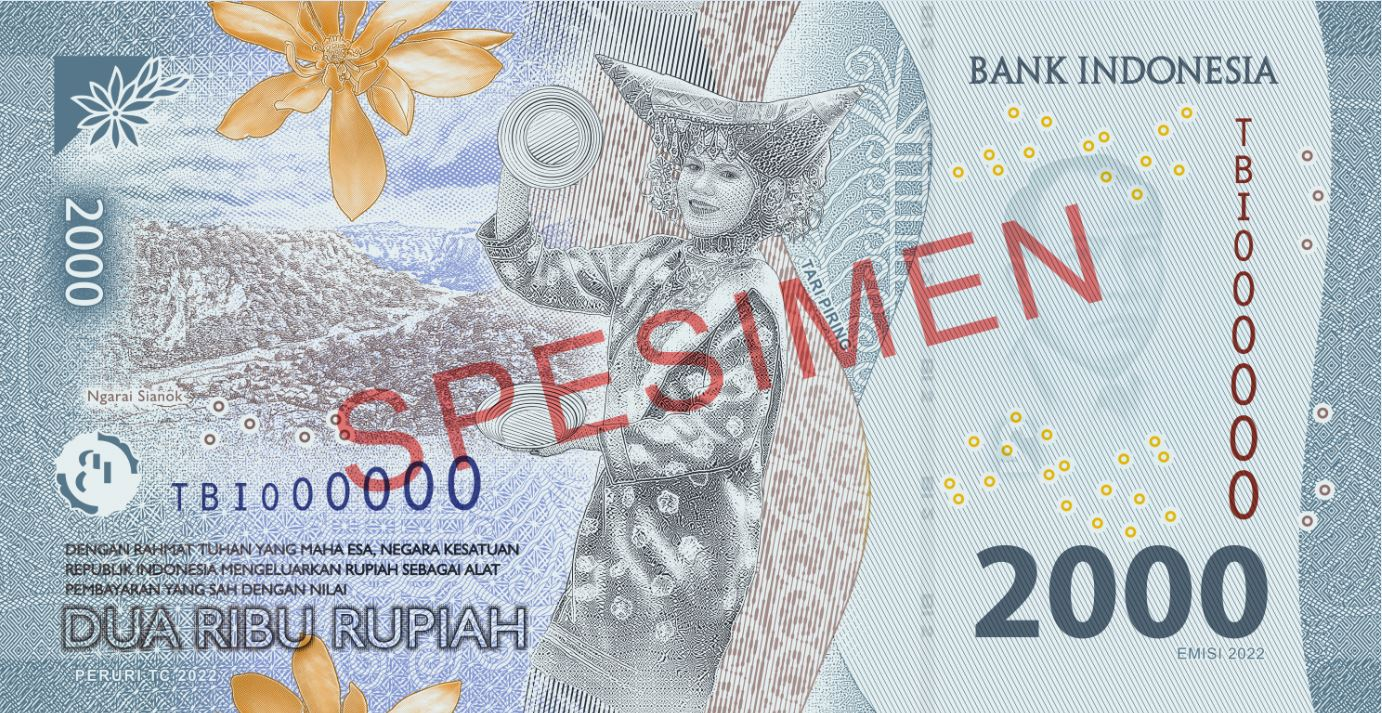
- Design: Sianok Canyon, tari piring, and champaka
- Designer: Bank of Indonesia
- Design date: 2022

The Indonesian two thousand rupiah banknote (Rp2,000) is a denomination of the Indonesian rupiah. First introduced on 9 July 2009, it was made legal tender the following day and has since been modified two times, first in 2016 and then in 2022. All notes of this denomination are printed in cotton paper since its introduction.

== 2009 issue ==
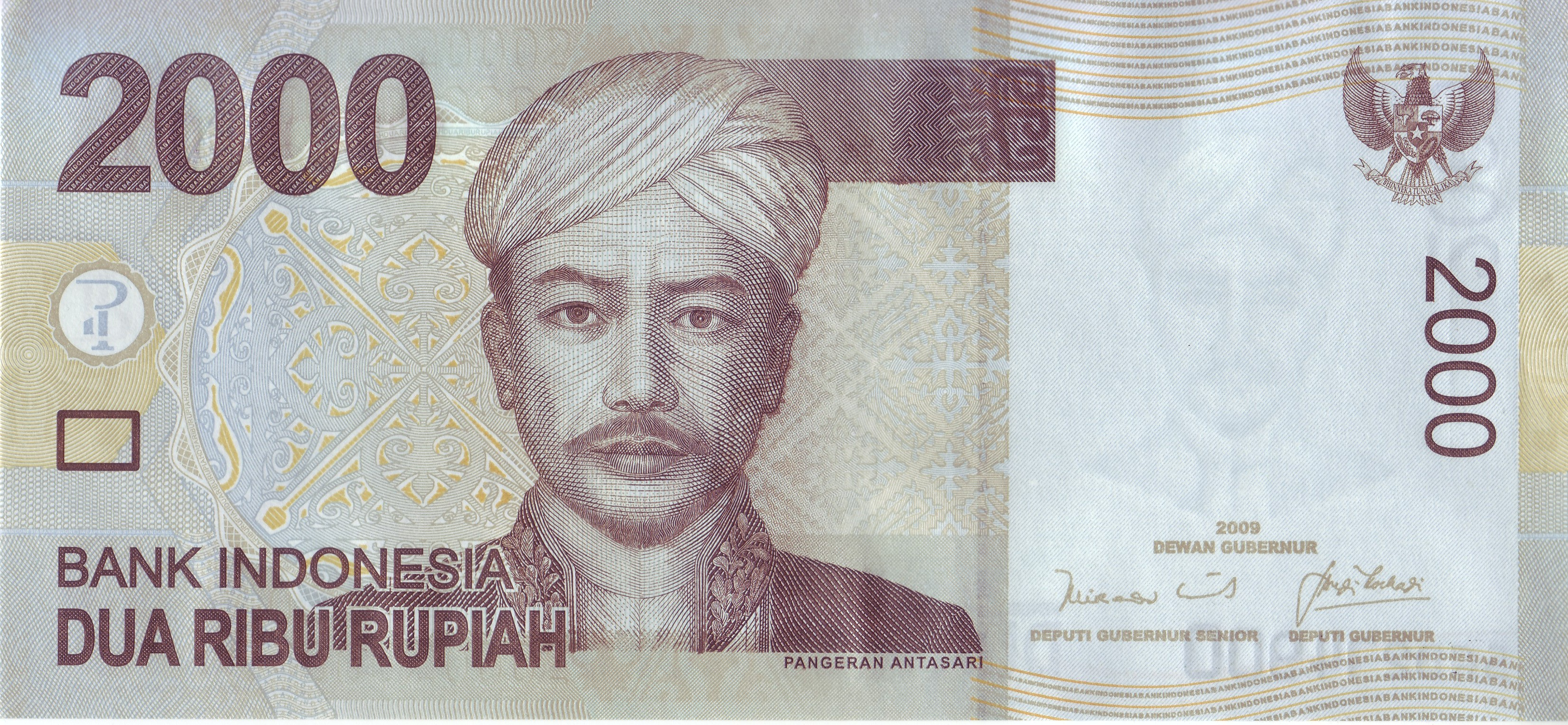
Obverse of first (2009) issue

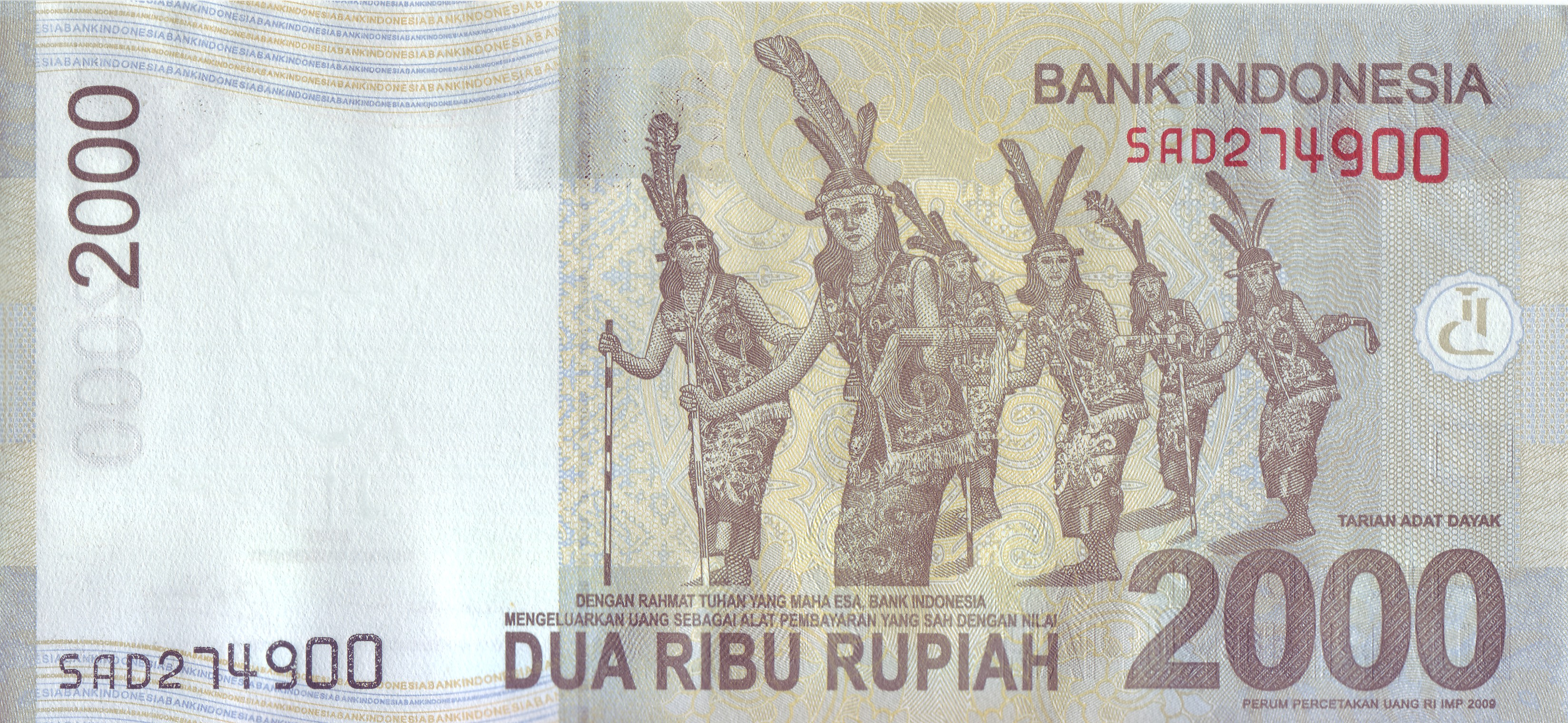
Reverse of first (2009) issue

The first Rp2,000 note was gray and featured the portrait of Prince Antasari on its obverse and a depiction of a Dayak traditional dance on its reverse. Its security features include a watermark of Prince Antasari himself, a security thread with the repeating words "BI2000" that shines red under black light, microtext, a see-through image of Bank Indonesia's logo, relief printing, and a rectangular blind code in intaglio on the lower left part of the obverse.

== 2016 issue ==
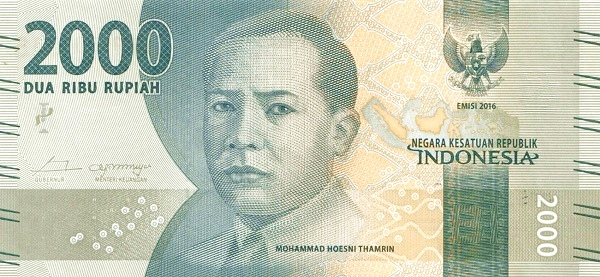
Obverse of 2016 issue

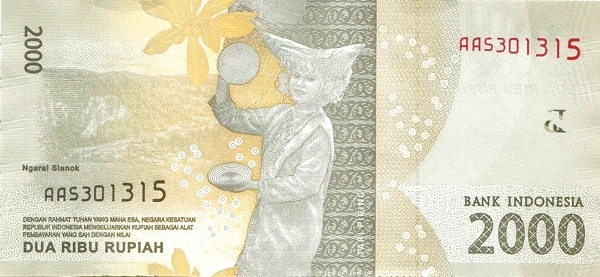
Reverse of 2016 issue

The second issue of the Rp2,000 note was released on 19 December 2016. The green-gray note, which had a size of 141 mm × 65 mm (5.6 in × 2.6 in) and weighed 80 g (2.8 oz), featured the image of the national hero Mohammad Husni Thamrin on its obverse and depictions of the Sianok Canyon, the Tari Piring traditional dance, and champaka flower on its reverse. Its security features include microtext, intaglio printing, a see-through image, a security thread, a watermark of Prince Antasari, a latent image, and ultraviolet ink.

Notes of this series were sometimes confused with the higher-denominated 20,000 rupiah note from the same 2016 series, which was similar in color, denomination, design, and size. Bank Indonesia predicts that this note, alongside other notes of the 2016 series, will cease to be legal tender around 2025 or 2026.

== 2022 issue ==
The third issue of the Rp2,000 note was released on 17 August 2022, on Indonesia's 77th independence day. Although its obverse and reverse design remained the same, the banknote's size was reduced to 126 mm × 65 mm (5.0 in × 2.6 in) while its color scheme made colorful (in contrast to the previous series' monochrome) and its weight increased to 90 g (3.2 oz). Its security features include a security thread, ultraviolet ink art, intaglio printing, blind codes, a plastic coating that also increases its durability, a see-through image of the Bank Indonesia logo, and a watermark of Mohammad Husni Thamrin.

It is reported that these notes are sometimes confused with the higher-denominated 50,000 rupiah note of the same 2022 series.

== See also ==
- Indonesian rupiah
- Banknotes of the rupiah
