= Banjar mask dance =

Indonesian traditional dance

- Native name: Tari Topeng Banjar
- Inventor: Banjar
- Origin: Indonesia

Banjar Mask Dance (Indonesian: Tari Topeng Banjar) is a local indigenous art form of Banjar in South Kalimantan, Indonesia. It is called mask dance because the dancers use masks (Topeng) when dancing. This dance is usually played for sacred ceremonies, such as the manyanggar ceremony. The ceremony is a ritual to clean inherited equipment, treat supernatural diseases, give thanks after harvesting, cleansing the village of evil spirits, and ask for protection from disasters. The Banjar mask dance will be performed in the form of a wayang wong, where the dancers will wear masks and are accompanied by a set of gamelan salendro.

Banjar mask dance is known to have grown and developed since the Kingdom of Dipa. The shape of the Banjar mask consists of several types, such as Gunung Sari, Patih, Panji, Batarakala (Sangkala/Gajah Barung), Pantul, Tambam, Pamambi, Pamimdu, Kalana , and Ranggajiwa.

Until now, the banjar mask dance performance is still performed as an expression of gratitude, hoping for safety from evil spirits.

== See also ==
- Betawi mask dance
- Cirebonese mask dance
- Topeng dance
- Dance in Indonesia
