= Bentara Budaya Yogyakarta =

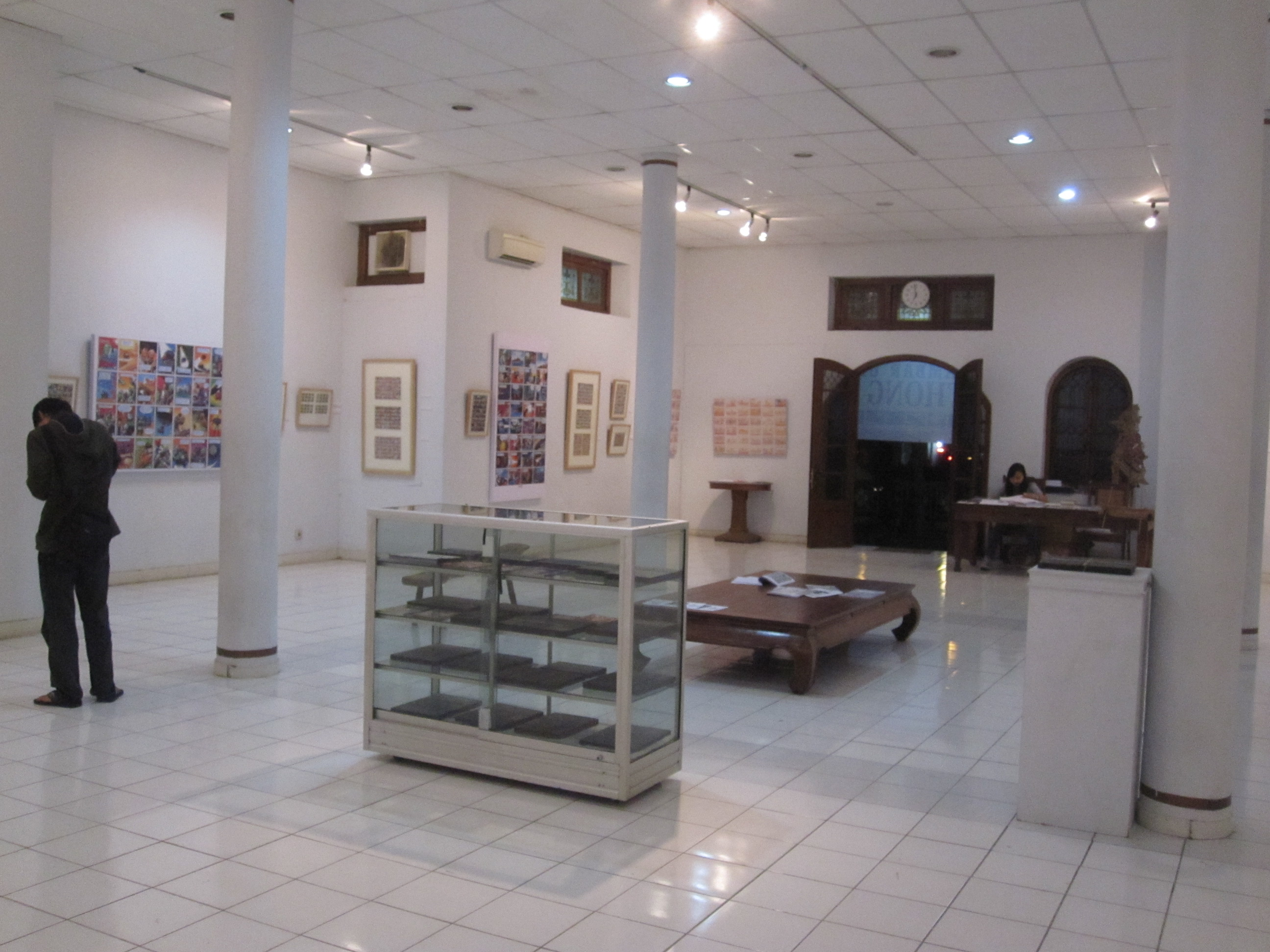
Gallery room of Bentara Budaya Yogyakarta

Bentara Budaya Yogyakarta is a cultural center located in Yogyakarta, Indonesia. Bentara Budaya Yogyakarta was opened on 26 September 1982, funded by Kompas Gramedia Group.

Bentara Budaya Yogyakarta is the Jakarta branch of Bentara Budaya, a cultural institution managed by Kompas Gramedia Group which also has several cultural centers in Jakarta, Surakarta (as Balai Soedjatmoko), and Bali.
