= Bentara Budaya Jakarta =

Museum in Jakarta, Indonesia

Coordinates: 6.2102°S 106.7954°E

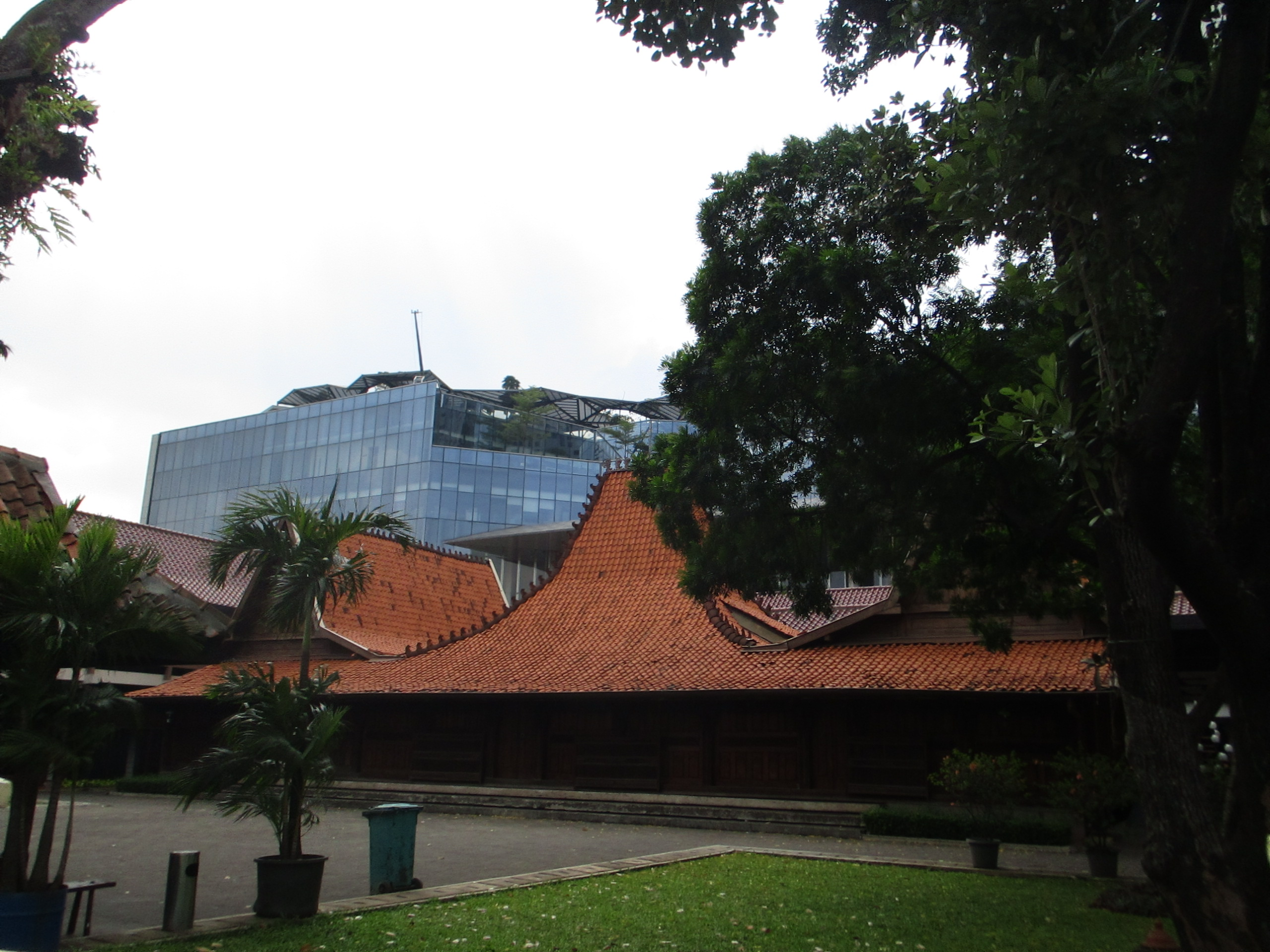
The centerpiece of Bentara Budaya Jakarta is traditional Javanese Omah Kudus, the galleries and exhibition halls are constructed surrounding this wooden house

Bentara Budaya Jakarta is a cultural center located on Jalan Palmerah Selatan 17, Central Jakarta, Indonesia. The institution consists of a museum and an art gallery. Open from Monday to Friday at 8 AM to 5 PM, the gallery is closed on weekends and holidays, with an exception being made when special exhibitions are present. Entry to the gallery is free of charge and open to visitors.

As a cultural institution, Bentara Budaya Jakarta hosts a wide spectrum of Indonesian cultural activities, from traditional to modern Indonesian arts, exhibitions of fine arts such as paintings, sculptures and graphic arts, to performing arts, and concerts.

Bentara Budaya Jakarta is the Jakarta branch of Bentara Budaya, a cultural institution managed by Kompas Gramedia Group which also has several cultural centers in Yogyakarta, Surakarta (as Balai Soedjatmoko), and Bali.

== History ==
The institution was founded on 26 September 1982 by Jakob Oetama, the founder of Kompas Gramedia. An avid art collector, Oetama felt the need to share his art collections, which included paintings by Indonesian artists, sculptures, antique Chinese and Indonesian ceramics, and traditional crafts such as wayang. Subsequently, a building was constructed to store and display the collection, which later developed into an art gallery and exhibition hall to showcase the works of Indonesian artists and to promote Indonesian culture. Later, Bentara Budaya became a cultural institution, with a cultural philanthropic branch with the corporate social responsibility practices of the Kompas Gramedia Group. The Bentara Budaya premiered with the ceramics exhibition of Studio Titik Temu Tembikar, by Liosadang, Purwakarta promoted by the artist Adi Munardi in 1985.

Bentara Budaya Jakarta Museum was opened on 26 June 1986. Modeled after Bentara Budaya in Yogyakarta, the design of the Jakarta building was influenced by a traditional house from the Javanese Regency of Kudus. The teakwood house, designed by the famed architect Romo Mangunwijaya, incorporated many aspects of traditional Indonesian, Hindu, and Chinese architecture. With its vast array of art collections and through its patronage and support for Indonesian and foreign artists, Bentara Budaya Jakarta sets its mission to nurture, conserve and promote art and culture, as well as to contribute and participate in the Indonesian cultural scene.

== Collection ==
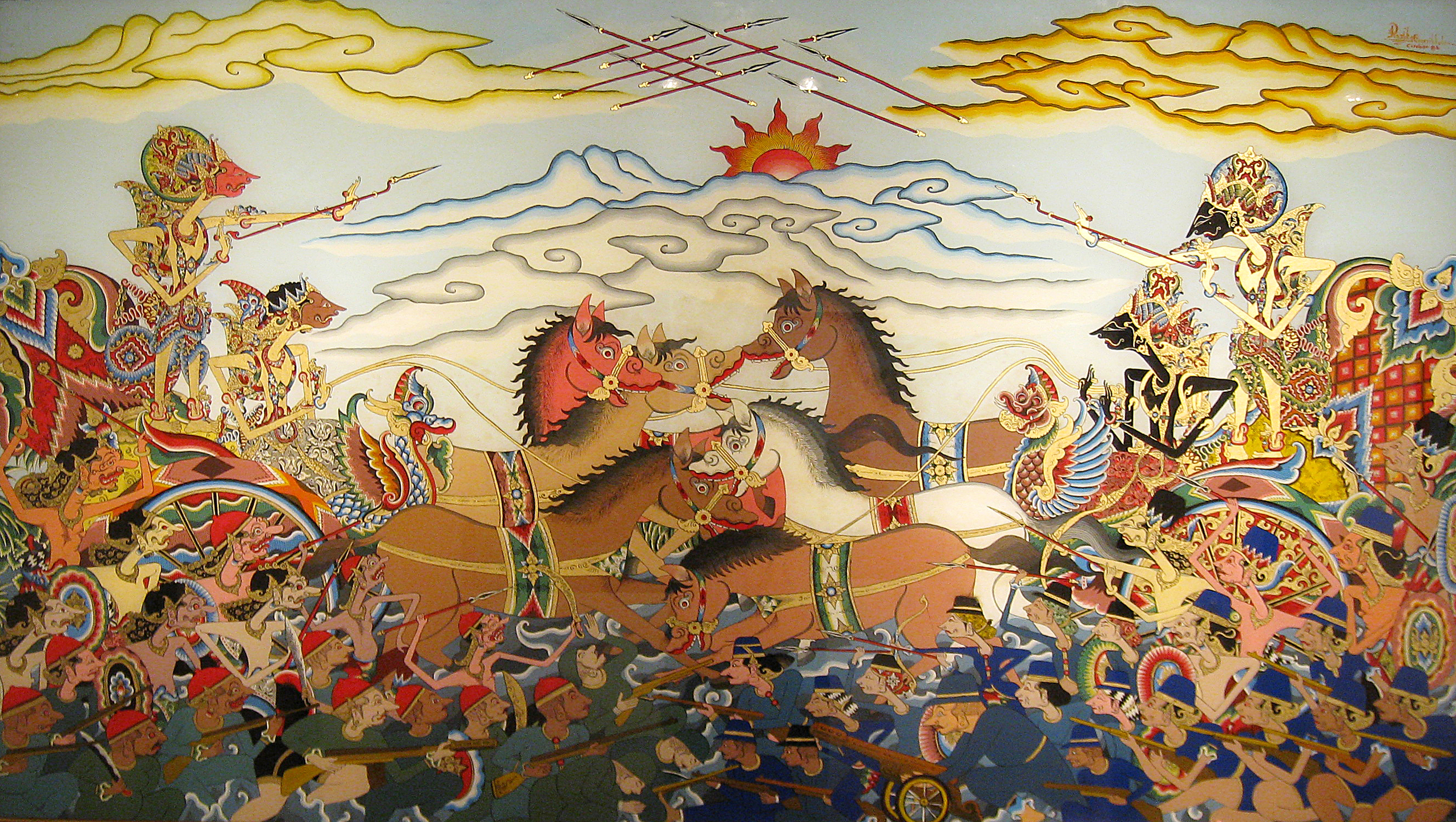
Cirebon-style wayang glass painting, depicting Bharatayudha, Collection of Bentara Budaya Jakarta

Today, Bentara Budaya Jakarta has about 573 paintings by various Indonesian artists, among others Affandi, S. Sudjojono, Hendra Gunawan, Basoeki Abdullah, Bagong Kussudiardjo, Trubus Sudarsono, Rudolf Bonnet, H Widayat, Otto Djaya and many more. Bentara Budaya also hosts a large collection of Balinese classical paintings, which includes the works of I Gusti Nyoman Lempad, I Ketut Regig, I Gusti Ketut Kobot, Ida Bagus Made, Anak Agung Gde Sobrat, Dewa Putu Bedil, I Gusti Made Togog, I Ketut Nama, and I Wayan Jujul.

The art collection also includes 625 antique Chinese ceramics from the Yuan, Tang, Sung, Ming and Ching dynasties. Native Indonesian ceramics also form part of its collection, which include pottery and ceramics from Singkawang, Bali, Plered, Trowulan and Cirebon. Bentara Budaya's collection of the Papuan and Balinese artworks includes 400 sculptures. It also hosts a collection of 120 antique wayang golek pieces, created by Asep Sunarya, which depict the characters of punakawan, Pandavas and Kauravas. Other works of art includes antique furniture pieces, such as wooden tables, chairs and cupboards, as well as statues of Buddha in various hand positions of mudra. All collections are stored and preserved in Bentara Budaya Jakarta. Bentara Budaya Jakarta not only preserves Indonesian culture, but also collaborates with other art institutions and foreign artists in order to provide education and promote both Indonesian and international art and culture.

== See also ==
- Indonesian art
- List of museums and cultural institutions in Indonesia
- Architecture of Indonesia
