= Security thread =

Security feature of banknotes

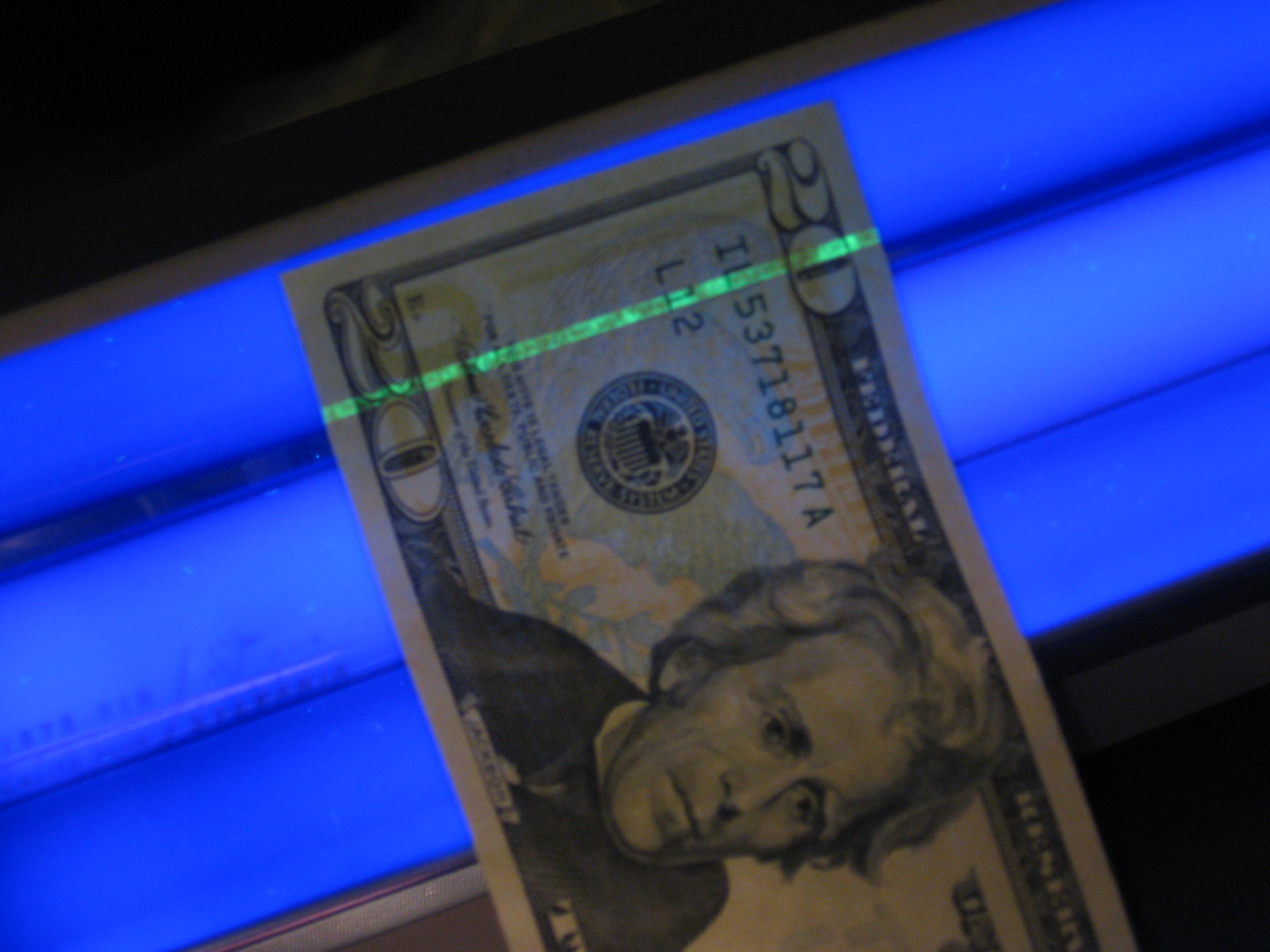
The security thread in a United States twenty-dollar bill, glowing under a blacklight

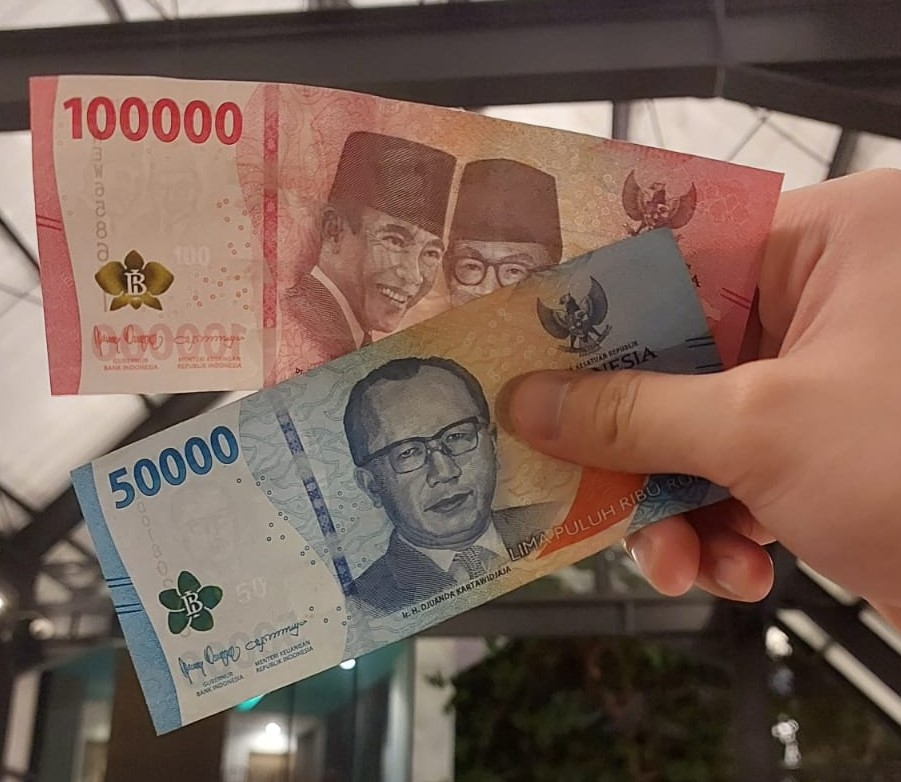
The security threads of the latest Indonesian Rp100,000 and Rp50,000 notes issued in 2022

A security thread is a security feature of many banknotes to protect against counterfeiting. In the USA, such threads, first in silk and later in nylon have been used at least since the 1950's. A clear, inscribed polyester thread was introduced in United States banknotes in 1990. It consists of a thin ribbon that is woven through the note's paper.

Usually the ribbon runs vertically, and is "woven" into the paper, so that it at some places emerges on the front side and at the remaining places at the rear side of the paper. It is made of metal foil, but sometimes of plastic, and oftentimes it has some text or numbers (e.g., the denomination) engraved.

Threads are embedded within the paper fiber and can be completely invisible or have a star burst effect, where the thread appears to weave in and out of the paper when viewed from one side, while the thread will always appear as a solid line when held up to the light. Features can be built into the thread material e.g., microprinting on a transparent plastic thread or adding materials so they fluoresce under ultraviolet light. The thread is a difficult feature to counterfeit, but some counterfeiters have been known to print a thin grey line or a thin line of varnish in the area of the thread.

Security threads can also be used as an anti-counterfeiting device in passports. Those are generally made of plastic and contain microprinting.
