= Cirebonese mask dance =

Indonesian traditional dance

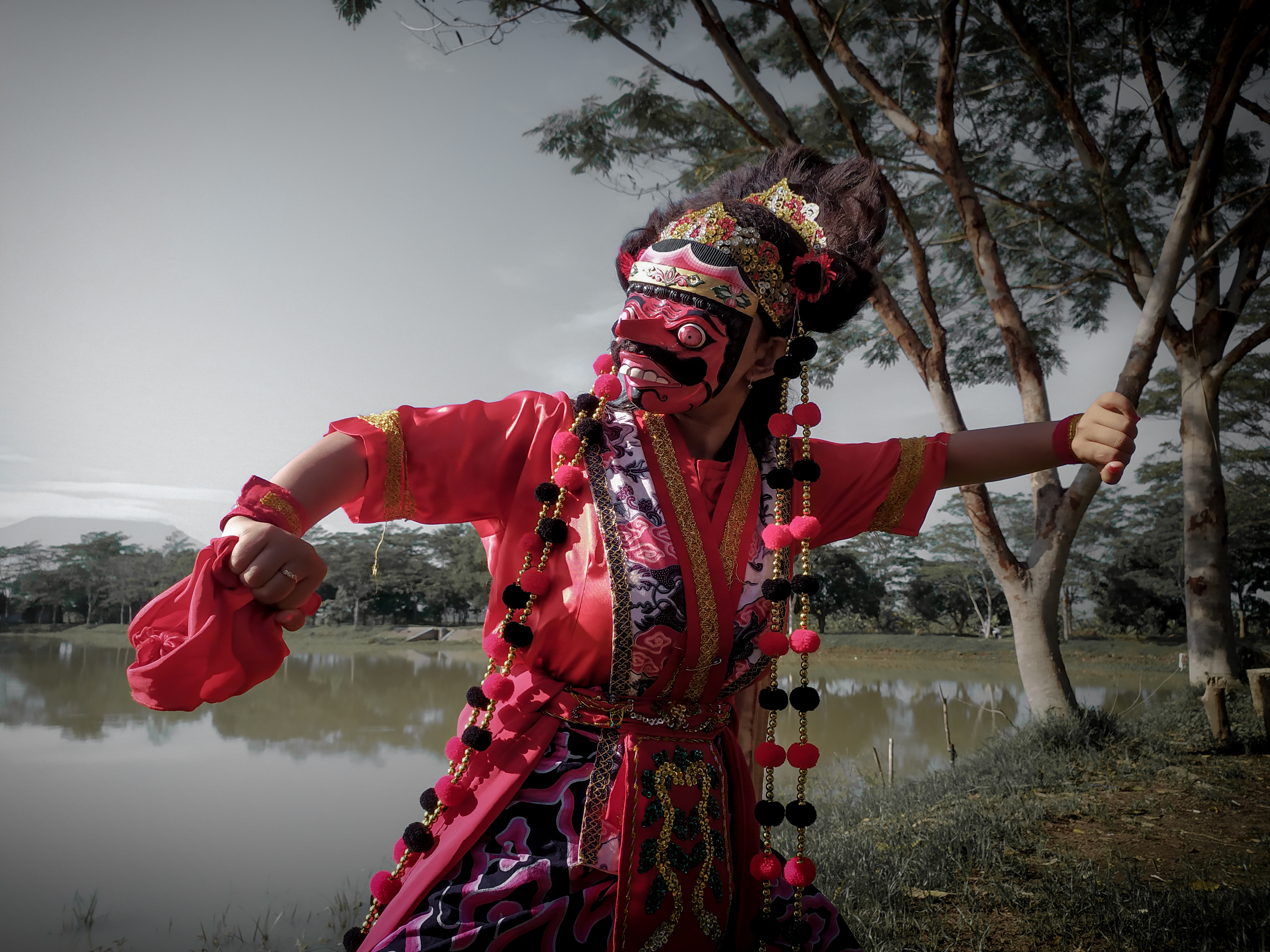
- Cirebonese mask dance performance in batik trusmi
- Native name: Tari Topeng Cirebon
- Inventor: Cirebonese
- Origin: Indonesia

Cirebonese mask dance (Indonesian: Tari Topeng Cirebon; Cirebonese: beksan topéng Cerbon) is a local indigenous art form of Cirebon in Java, including Indramayu and Jatibarang, West Java and Brebes, Central Java. It is called mask dance because the dancers use masks when dancing. There is a lot of variety in Javanese mask dance, both in terms of the dance style and the stories to be conveyed. This mask dance can be performed by solo dancers, or performed by several people.

Each mask represents different meanings that influence the dance and their movements, and in the village called Beber, Ligung, Majalengka, in west java they have a dance with the characters using masks of different colors and expressions called Panji, Samba, Rumyang, Tumenggung and Kelana dating back to the 17th century. Brought by an artist from Gegesik, Cirebon named Setian, but according to experts on Cirebon Mask Dalang Beber styles such as mimi Yayah and Ki Dalang Kardama who first brought the Mask dance to Beber village and became the Beber style Cirebon Mask dance were mimi Sonten and Surawarcita who still comes from Gegesik since then handed down several generations of artists. According to Ki Andet Suanda, the division of acts in the Beber style Cirebon mask dance is based on interpretations of human nature and consciousness.

- Panji's character is depicted as a delicate soul who has slow and soft dance movements.
- Samba depicts a child-like character with a growing mind where they dance swiftly
- Rumyang depicts a human soul who has given up their materialistic and wordly lust to be a better person.
- Tumenggung represents a loyal person who is also wise and mature.
- Minakjingga (or otherwise called Klana) has a red faced mask that depicts a human soul who is swayed by lust into being impatient, hateful, and hotheaded.

According to Ki Pandi Surono (Cirebon's cultural practitioner and maestro of the Beber-style Cirebon Mask dance) in the past, Cirebon Mask dance performances, especially the Beber style, were performed at night and the Rumyang round was performed close to the rising of the sun. The sun's rays are faintly visible (Cirebon: ramyang-ramyang) from the word ramyang this is what this act is called, further information about the philosophy of the rumyang round which is staged at the end after the Klana Mask scene which is a projection of a soul full of lust and emotion explained by Ki Waryo (Cirebon cultural figure who is also the puppeteer of the Cirebon leather puppets in the Kidulan style (Palimanan) and a skilled Cirebon mask maker) is the son of Ki Empek. Ki Waryo explained that Rumyang's philosophy is related to a projection of the human soul that has left its worldly desires and has become a whole human being (a fragrant human being) because it is no longer shackled by worldly desires. Rumyang is translated into two words, namely arum (Indonesian: fragrant) and yang (Indonesian: human / person) so that Rumyang is literally interpreted as a fragrant human being.

Graceful hand and body movements, and musical accompaniment dominated by drums and fiddle, are hallmarks of Javanese mask dance. The dance is performed on special occasions for local officials, or for other traditional celebrations.

== Gallery ==
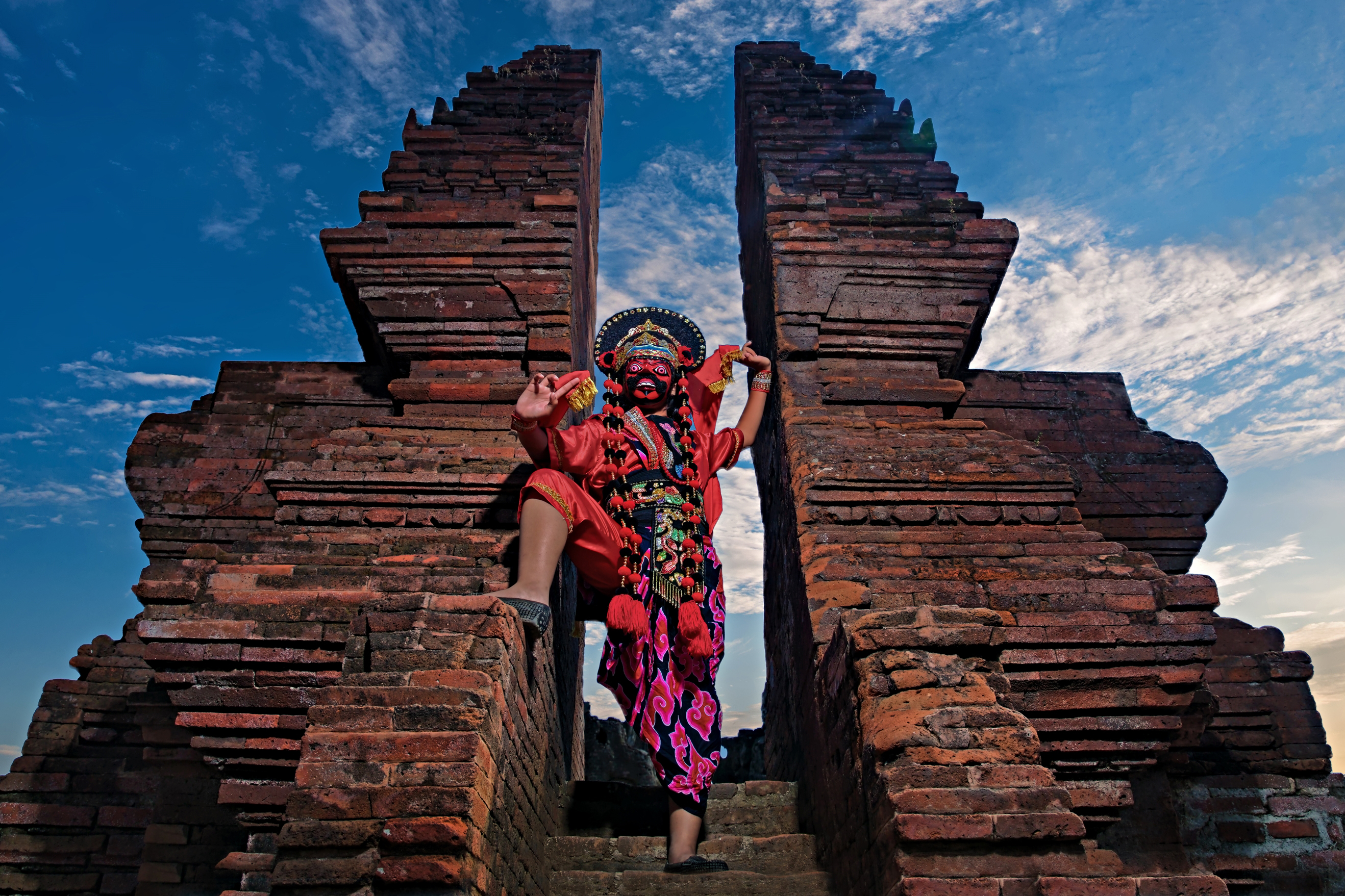
Cirebonese mask dance performance in Bentar temple complex

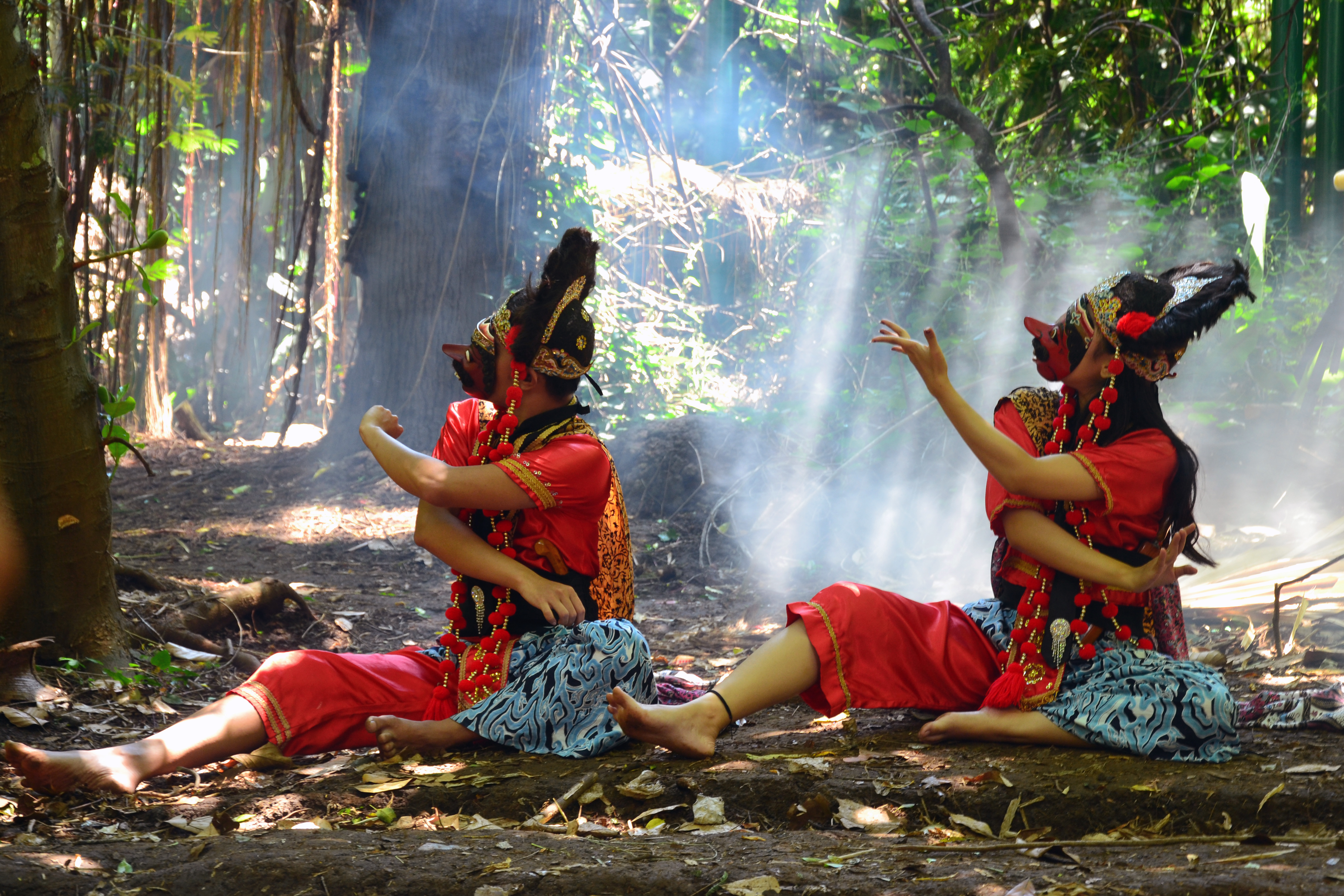
Cirebonese mask dancer movement

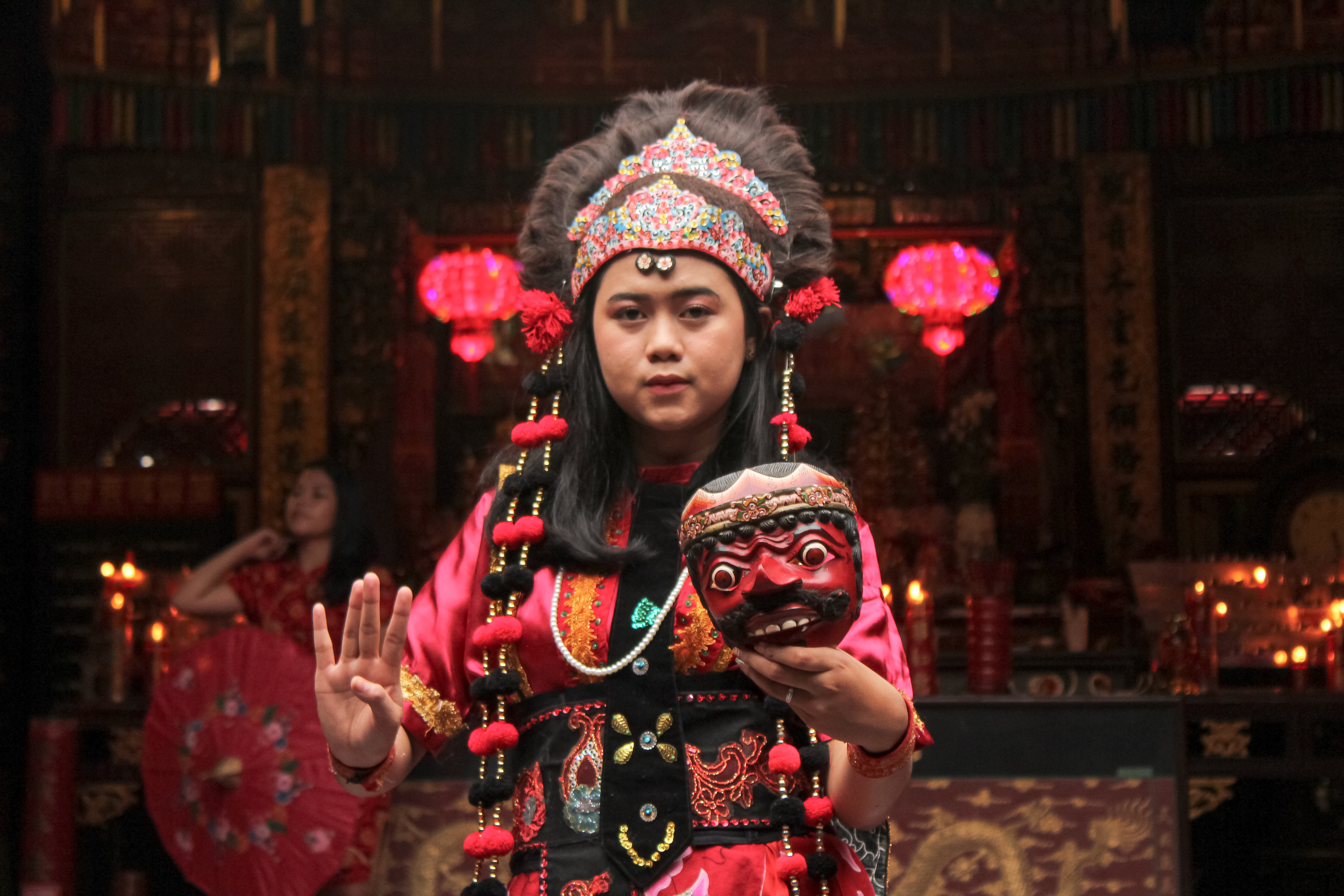
A Javan (Cirebonese) female mask dancer

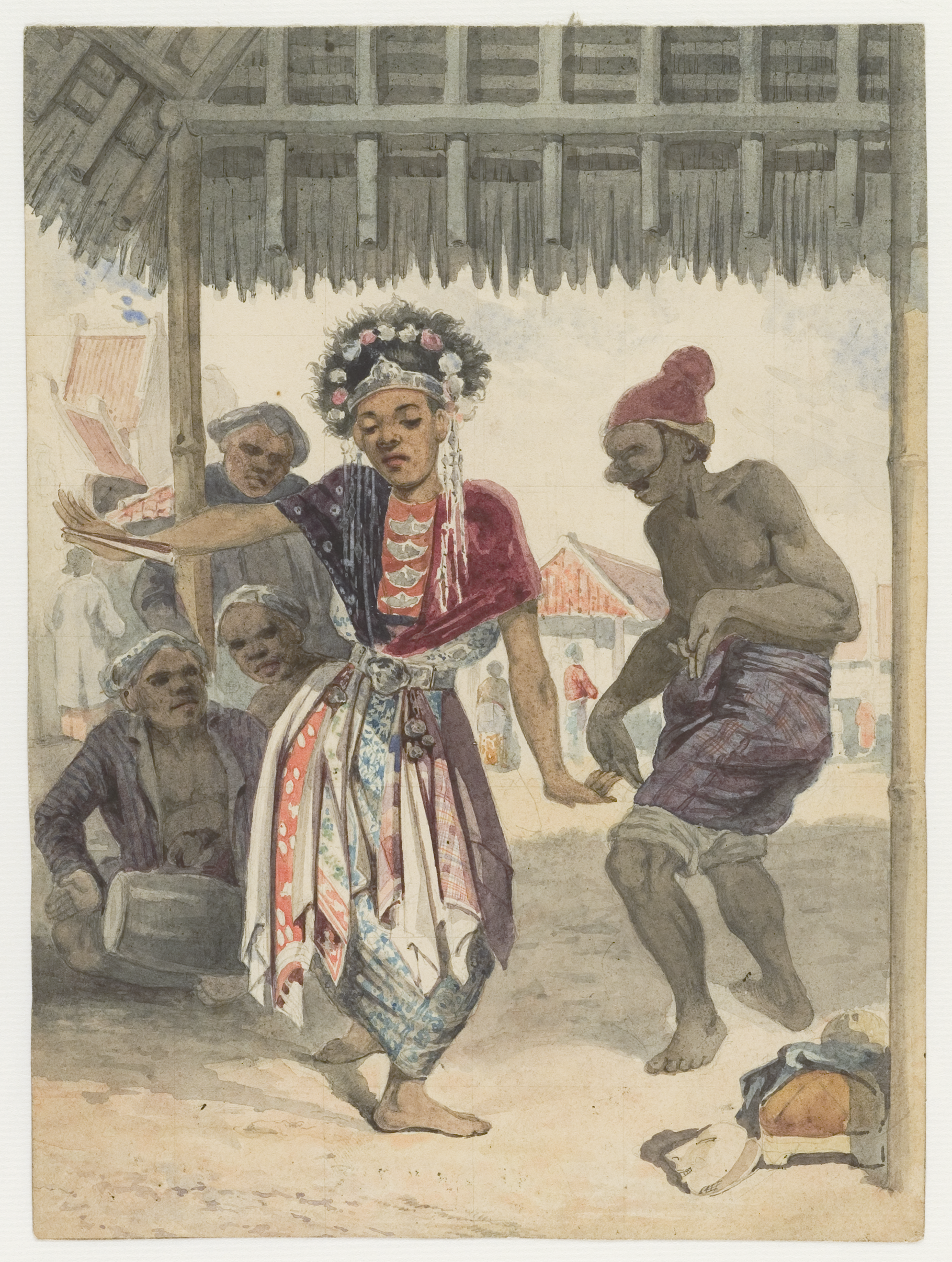
Illustration of Topeng Babakan performance in Cirebon, c. 1851

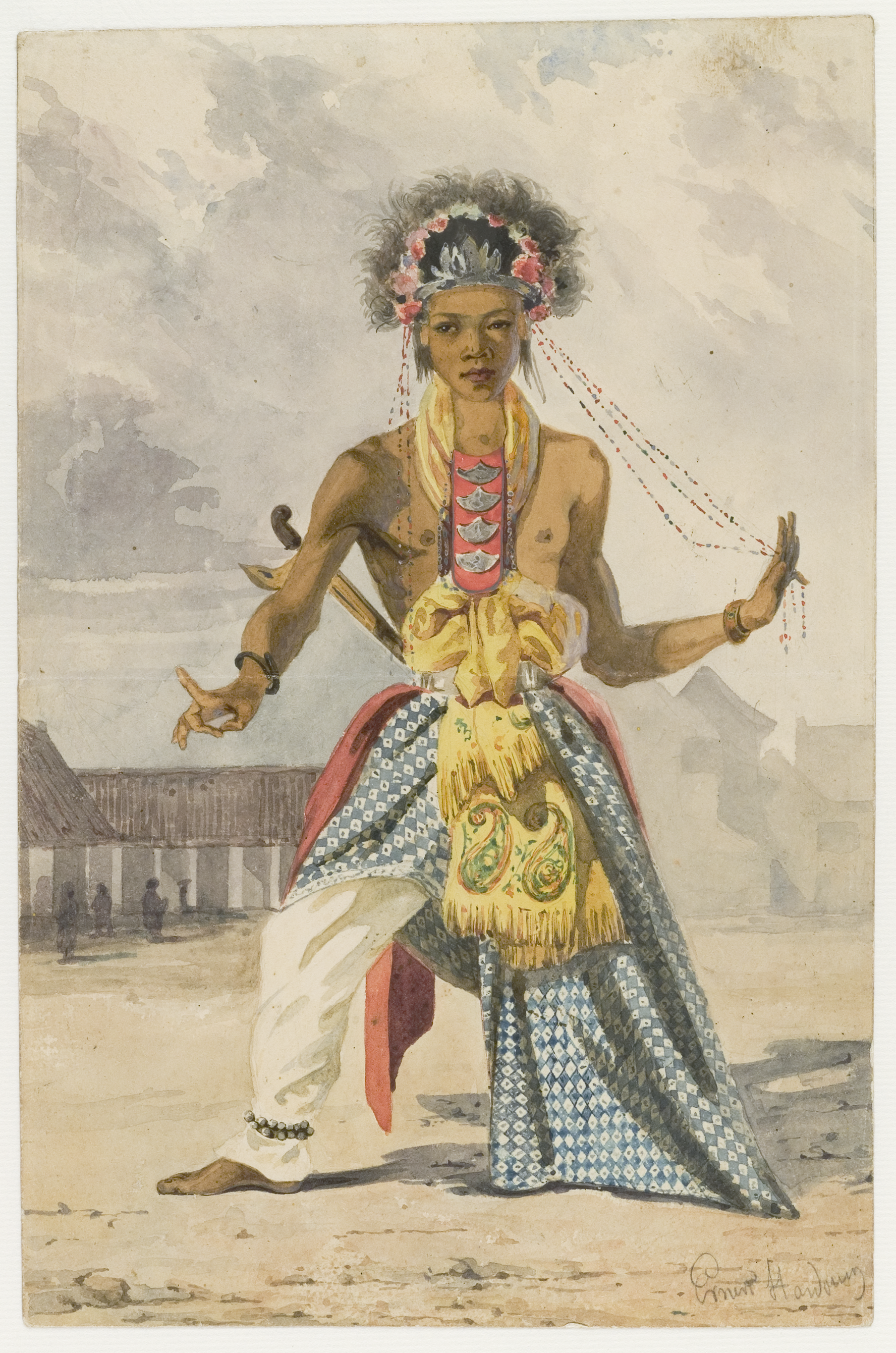
An illustration of Javan (Cirebonese) street-dancer in Cirebon

== See also ==
- Betawi mask dance
- Banjar mask dance
- Ireng mask dance
- Topeng dance
- Dance in Indonesia
