= Betawi mask dance =

Indonesian traditional dance

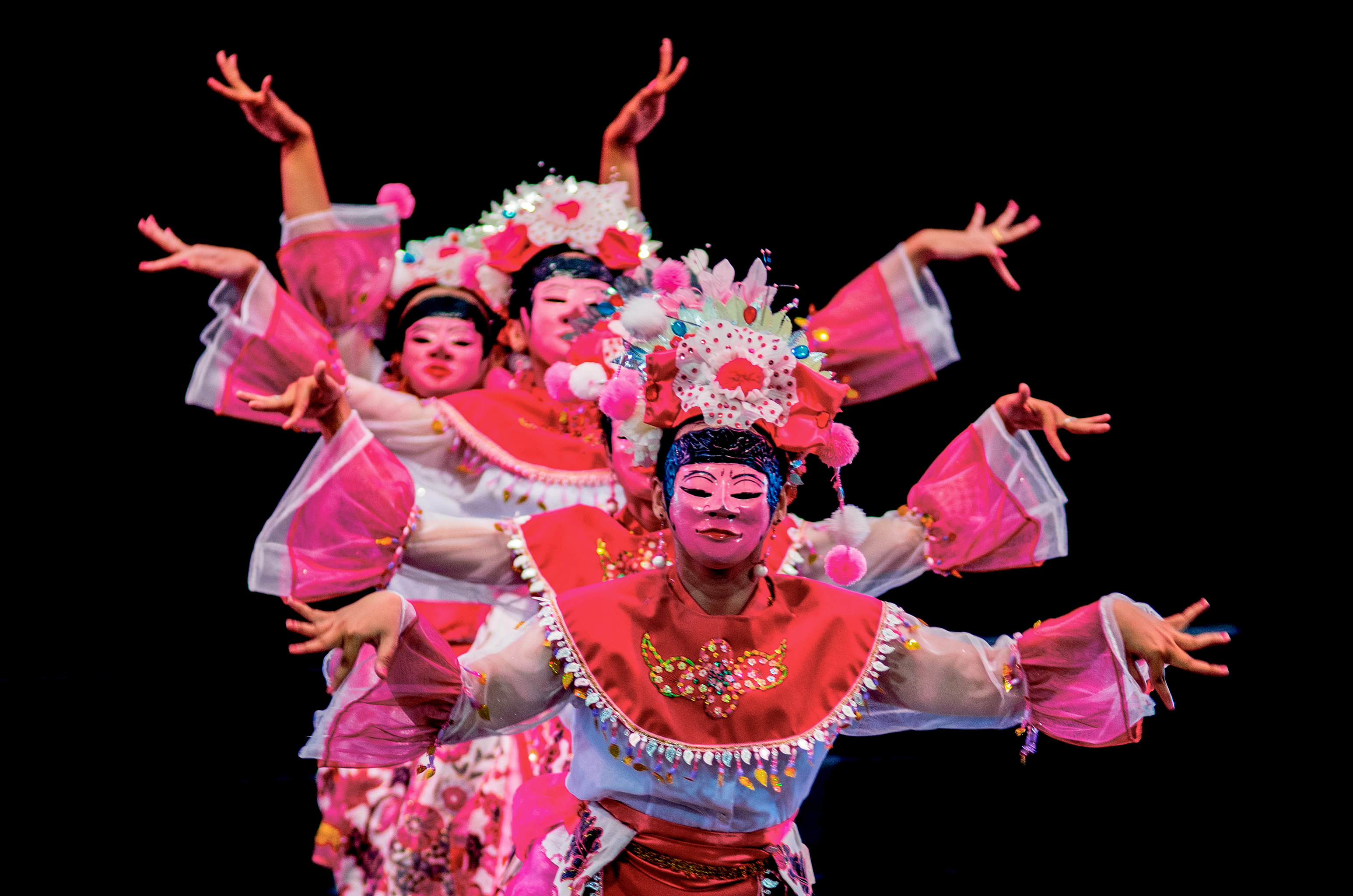
- Betawi mask dance performance
- Native name: Topèng Betawi
- Genre: Traditional dance drama
- Inventor: Betawi people
- Origin: Indonesia

The Betawi mask dance (Betawi: Topèng Betawi) is a theatrical form of dance and drama of the Betawi people in Jakarta, Indonesia. This dance-drama encompasses dance, music, bebodoran (comedy) and lakon (drama). The Betawi mask dance demonstrates the theme of Betawi society life which is represented in the form of dance and drama. It is called mask dance because the dancers use topeng (mask) during dancing and Betawi people believed that the topeng has magical powers.

== History and origin ==
The Betawi mask dance was first created by Mak Kinang and Kong Djioen in 1930 which was inspired by Cirebonese mask dance. This theatrical form of dance drama developed in the area of the Betawi Pinggir community (Betawi Ora) in Jakarta.

== Social functions ==
The Betawi mask dance has some social functions in Betawi society. In the past, Betawi people believed that the Betawi mask dance had a function to keep them away from dangers, diseases, and calamities. However, nowadays, Betawi occasions often perform the Betawi mask dance as a part of the occasion, such as in Betawi weddings, circumcisions, and Lebaran.

== Musical instruments ==
In the Betawi mask dance performance, musical instruments that are usually played include rebab, gong, kendang, kempul, kulanter, and kecrek.

== See also ==
- Dance in Indonesia
- Cirebonese mask dance
- Topeng dance
