= List of musical instruments by Hornbostel–Sachs number: 111 =

This is a list of instruments by Hornbostel-Sachs number, covering those instruments that are classified under 111 under that system. These instruments are directly struck idiophones.

1: Idiophones. instrument in which the substance of the instrument itself produces sounds, without requiring stretched membranes or strings.

11: Struck idiophones. Instruments that produce sounds through vibration caused by percussion action - hitting, shaking, or scraping.

111: Directly struck idiophones. Instrument that is struck by a player directly; either by mechanical intermediate devices, beaters, keyboards, or by pulling ropes, etc.

111.1: Concussion (clapper) idiophones. Complementary sound producing parts are stuck against each other.
- Castanets
- Claves
- Clash Cymbals
111.2 Percussion Idiophones
- 111.21 Percussion sticks or bars
  - Crystallophones:
    - Glass marimba
    - Glasschord
  - Triangle
  - Xylophones (strictly made of wood):
    - Balafon
    - Gandingan a kayo
    - Kulintang a kayo
    - Luntang or kwintangan kayo
    - Marimba
    - Marimbaphone (also bowed)
    - Pong lang
    - Xylorimba
- 111.22 Percussion plaque
  - Crotales
  - Lithophone
  - Metallophones:
    - Celesta
    - Fangxiang
    - Gangsa
    - Gendér
    - Glockenspiel
    - Kulintang a tiniok, kulintang a putao or sarunay
    - Ranat ek lek
    - Ranat thum lek
    - Toy piano
    - Ugal
    - Vibraphone
- 111.23 Percussion tube
  - Tubular bells or chimes
- 111.24 Vessels:
  - Cymbals
    - Crash cymbal
    - Hi-hat cymbal
    - Ride cymbal
    - Splash cymbal
  - Hang
  - Slit drums:
    - Agung a tamlang
    - Kagul or tagutok
  - Steelpan or steel drum
  - Tank drum
  - Udu (also an aerophone)
    - 111.241 Gongs:
      - Agung or agong
      - Babendil
      - Gandingan
      - Kulintang or kolintang
    - 111.242 Bells
      - Bell
      - Cowbell

12: Instruments set into vibration by plucking.
13: Instruments in which the substance of the instrument itself produces sounds and are set into vibration by rubbing.
14: Instruments set into vibration by blowing or moving air.
15: Idiophones not allocated a number in the Hornbostel-Sachs system.

2: Instruments in which sound is produced primarily through a vibrating membrane (membranophone). This includes all drums.
3: Instruments in which sound is produced by one or more vibrating strings (chordophones, string instruments).
4: Instruments in which sound is produced through vibrating air (aerophone). This includes wind instruments and free-reed instruments.
5: Instruments that generate their sound electronically (electrophone).
