= Struck idiophone =

Class of musical instruments

Struck idiophones is one of the categories of idiophones (that is, any musical instrument that creates sound primarily by the instrument as a whole vibrating—without the use of strings or membranes) that are found in the Hornbostel-Sachs system of musical instrument classification.

Struck idiophones are categorised as 11 in the Hornbostel-Sachs system. There are two main categories of struck idiophones, directly (111) and indirectly (112) struck.

According to Sachs,

"Struck Idiophones consist of one or several pieces made of a sonorous substance and struck with a stick or a similar device with rotary motion of the arm. Again, they are distinguished by their materials."

== Directly struck (111) ==
Directly struck idiophones produce sound resulting from a direct action of the performer as opposed to the indirectly struck idiophones. The player strikes the instrument with a direct action, either by hand or by mechanical intermediate devices, beaters, keyboards, or by pulling ropes, etc. It is definitive that the player can apply clearly defined individual strokes and that the instrument itself is equipped for this kind of percussion.

There are two main categories of directly struck idiophones, concussion idiophones (111.1) and percussion idiophones (111.2).

=== Concussion idiophones or clappers (111.1) ===
Two or more complementary sonorous parts are struck against each other.

According to Sachs, idiophones struck together:

IDIOPHONES STRUCK TOGETHER or concussion instruments. They are either two-handed, if each hand holds the other part (as with cymbals), or else one-handed (or clappers)....It should indicated, if possible, whether they are violently clashed together or gently brought together in order to cause a tinkling sound. Clappers must be described according to their materials...A combined type is cymbals on clappers.

According to Sachs, struck idiophones:

consist of one or several pieces made of a sonorous substance and struck with a stick or a similar device with rotary motion of the arm. Again, they are distinguished by materials.

111.11 Concussion sticks or stick clappers (nearly equal thickness and width).

- Clapsticks
- Claves

111.12 Concussion plaques or plaque clappers (flat).

- Clapper
- Guban
- Paiban
- Pak
- Slapstick

111.13 Concussion troughs or trough clappers (shallow).

- Devil chase

111.14 Concussion vessels or vessel clappers (deep).

- Spoons

111.141 Castanets - Natural and hollowed-out vessel clappers.

- Castanets
- Krap

111.142 Cymbals - Vessel clappers with manufactured rim.

- Chap
- Ching
- Clash Cymbals

=== Percussion idiophones (111.2) ===
The instrument is struck either with a non-sonorous object (hand, stick, striker) or against a non-sonorous object (human body, the ground).

111.21 Percussion sticks.

111.211 Individual percussion sticks.

- Dhantal
- Triangle

111.212 Sets of percussion sticks in a range of different pitches combined into one instrument. - All xylophones, as long as their sounding components are not in two different planes.

- Balafon
- Gandingan a kayo
- Glasschord
- Glass marimba
- Glasspiel/verrillon
- Kulintang a kayo
- Luntang or kwintangan kayo
- Marimba
- Wooden Marimbaphone (also bowed)
- Xylophone
- Xylorimba

111.22 Percussion plaques.

111.221 Individual percussion plaques.

111.222 Sets of percussion plaques - Examples are the Lithophone and also most Metallophones.

- Crotales
- Lithophone
- Celesta
- Dulcitone
- Fangxiang
- Gangsa
- Gendèr
- Glockenspiel
- Kulintang a tiniok, kulintang a putao, or sarunay
- Metallophone
- Metal Marimbaphone (also bowed)
- Ranat ek lek
- Ranat thum lek
- Steel Marimba
- Toy piano
- Ugal
- Vibraphone

111.23 Percussion tubes.

111.231 Individual percussion tubes.

- Agung a tamlang
- Alimba
- Huari
- Huiringua
- Kagul
- Krin or Kolokolos
- Mondo
- Mukoko
- Slit drum
- Takuapu
- Teponaztli
- Tubular Wood block

111.232 Sets of percussion tubes.

- Tubular bells or chimes

111.24 Percussion vessels.

- Boungu
- Chuk
- Cymbals
- Crash cymbal
- Hank drum
- Hi-hat cymbal
- Hang
- Kagul or tagutok
- Ride cymbal
- Slit drums:
- Slit gong
- Splash cymbal
- Steelpan or steel drum
- Tumbuk kalang, traditional instrument set modified from rice mortar and pestles used in Negeri Sembilan, Malaysia
- Udu (also an aerophone)
- Wood block

111.241 Gongs - The vibration is strongest near the vertex.

111.241.1 Individual gongs.

- Babendil

111.241.2 Sets of gongs.

- Agung or agong
- Bock-a-da-bock
- Gandingan
- Kulintang or kolintang

111.242 Bells - The vibration is weakest near the vertex.

- Bell tree

111.242.1 Individual bells

111.242.11 Resting bells whose opening faces upward.

- Cowbell

111.242.12 Hanging bells suspended from the apex.

111.242.121 Hanging bells without internal strikers.

111.242.122 Hanging bells with internal strikers.

- Bell

111.242.2 Sets of bells or chimes.

111.242.21 Sets of resting bells whose opening faces upward.

111.242.22 Sets of hanging bells suspended from the apex.

111.242.221 Sets of hanging bells without internal strikers.

111.242.222 Sets of hanging bells with internal strikers.

== Indirectly struck (112) ==
Indirectly struck idiophones produce sound resulting from an indirect action of the performer as opposed to the directly struck idiophones. The player himself does not go through the movement of striking; percussion results indirectly through some other movement by the player. This category is divided in two main sub-categories: shaken idiophones and scraped idiophones.

=== Shaken idiophones or rattles (112.1) ===
The player makes a shaking motion

112.11 Suspension rattles - Perforated idiophones are mounted together, and shaken to strike against each other.

112.111 Strung rattles - Rattling objects are strung in rows on a cord.

112.112 Stick rattles - Rattling objects are strung on a bar or ring.

112.12 Frame rattles - Rattling objects are attached to a carrier against which they strike.

112.121 Pendant rattles.

112.122 Sliding rattles.

112.13 Vessel rattles - Rattling objects enclosed in a vessel strike against each other or against the walls of the vessel, or usually against both.

=== Scraped idiophones (112.2) ===
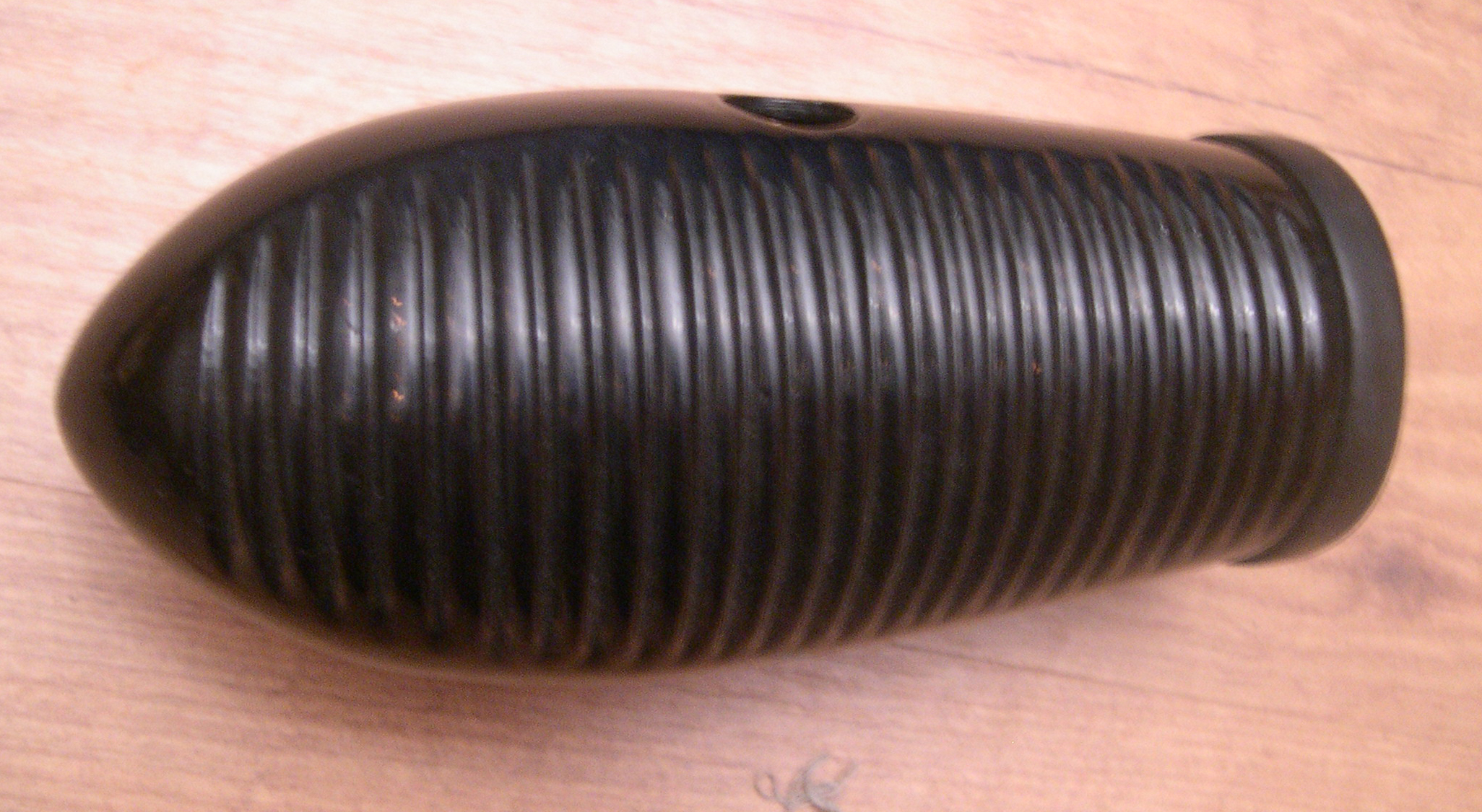
Fiberglass güiro

Modern Güiro
Sounds of the güiro

The player causes a scraping movement directly or indirectly; a non-sonorous object moves along the notched surface of a sonorous object, to be alternately lifted off the teeth and flicked against them; or an elastic sonorous object moves along the surface of a notched non-sonorous object to cause a series of impacts. This group must not be confused with that of friction idiophones.

112.21 Scraped sticks.

112.211 Scraped sticks without resonator.

- Jawbone (instrument)

112.212 Scraped sticks with resonator.

112.22 Scraped tubes.

- Kagul

112.23 Scraped vessels.

- Guayo
- Güira
- Güiro
- Reco-reco

112.24 Scraped wheels - cog rattles or Ratchet

- Derkach

112.3 Split idiophones - Instruments in the shape of two springy arms connected at one end and touching at the other: the arms are forced apart by a little stick, to jingle or vibrate on recoil.
