= List of idiophones by Hornbostel–Sachs number =

The Hornbostel–Sachs system of musical instrument classification defines idiophones as all instruments in which sound is produced primarily by way of the instrument itself vibrating without the use of membranes or strings.

== Idiophones (1) ==
=== Struck idiophones (11) ===
Idiophones set in motion by a percussion action: hitting, shaking, or scraping. Also see Struck idiophone.

==== Directly struck idiophones (111) ====
111.1 Concussion Idiophones or clappers

111.11 Concussion sticks or sticks of clap

- Claves (Cuba)

111.12 Concussion plaques or plaque clappers

- Clapper (Thailand, Cambodia)
- Guban
- Paiban
- Hyoshigi
- Pak
- Slapstick

111.13 Concussion troughs or trough clappers

- Balingbing

111.14 Concussion vessels or vessel clappers

- Spoons

111.141 Castanets - Natural and hollowed-out vessel clappers

- Castanets
- Coconut shells
- Krap

111.142 Cymbals - Vessel clappers with manufactured rim

- Chap
- Ching
- Cymbals, in pairs
  - Clash Cymbals in pairs
- Bock-a-da-bock

111.143 Concussion bells

111.2 Percussion Idiophones

111.21 Percussion sticks or bars

111.211 Individual percussion sticks

- Dhantal
- Triangle

111.212 Sets of percussion sticks in a range of different pitches combined into one instrument. - All xylophones, as long as their sounding components are not in two different planes.

- Balafon
- Gandingan a kayo
- Glasschord
- Glass Marimba
- Kulintang a kayo
- Luntang or kwintangan kayo
- Marimba
- Marimbaphone (also bowed)
- Pong lang
- Xylophone
- Xylorimba

111.22 Percussion plaques

111.221 Individual percussion plaques

111.222 Sets of percussion plaques

- Crotales
- Lithophone
- Metallophones
  - Celesta
  - Fangxiang
  - Gangsa
  - Gendér
  - Glockenspiel
  - Kulintang a tiniok (kulintang a putao, sarunay)
  - Ranat ek lek
  - Ranat thum lek
  - Toy piano
  - Ugal
  - Vibraphone

111.23 Percussion tubes

111.231 Individual percussion tubes.

- Agung a tamlang
- Alimba
- Huari
- Huiringua
- Kagul
- Krin or Kolokolos
- Mondo
- Mukoko
- Slit drum
- Takuapu
- Teponaztli

111.232 Sets of percussion tubes.

- Jegog
- Tubular bells or chimes

111.24 Percussion vessels.

- Boungu
- Cajón
- Chuk
- Cymbals
  - Crash cymbal
  - Hi-hat cymbal
  - Ride cymbal
  - Splash cymbal
- Handpan
- Hang
- Kagul or tagutok
- Slit drums:
- Slit gong
- Steelpan or steel drum
- Tank drum
- Tumbuk kalang, traditional instrument set modified from rice mortar and pestles used in Negeri Sembilan, Malaysia
- Udu (also an aerophone)
- Wood block
- Ghatam

111.241 Gongs - The vibration is strongest near the vertex.

111.241.1 Individual gongs.

- Babendil

111.241.11 Bossed gongs, flat gongs (with flange) and intermediate types

111.241.12 Gongs with divided surface sounding different pitches

111.241.2 Sets of gongs.

- Agung or agong
- Gandingan
- Kulintang or kolintang
- Reyong

111.241.21 Sets of bossed, flat gongs (with flange) and intermediate types

111.241.22 Sets of gongs with divided surface sounding different pitches

111.242 Bells - The vibration is weakest near the vertex.

- Bell tree

111.242.1 Individual bells

111.242.11 Resting bells whose opening faces upward.

- Cowbell

111.242.12 Hanging bells suspended from the apex.

111.242.121 Hanging bells without internal strikers.

111.242.122 Hanging bells with internal strikers.

- Bell

111.242.2 Sets of bells or chimes.

111.242.21 Sets of resting bells whose opening faces upward.

111.242.22 Sets of hanging bells suspended from the apex.

111.242.221 Sets of hanging bells without internal strikers.

111.242.222 Sets of hanging bells with internal strikers.

- Carillon

111.242.223 Sets of bells with attached external clappers.

111.243 Slit Drums

111.244 Percussion troughs

- Lali (Fiji)

111.25 Percussion boulders

- Rock gong

==== Indirectly struck idiophones (112) ====
112.1 Shaken idiophones or rattles

112.11 Suspension rattles - Perforated idiophones are mounted together, and shaken to strike against each other.

112.111 Strung rattles - Rattling objects are strung in rows on a cord.

- Sleigh bells

112.112 Stick rattles - Rattling objects are strung on a bar or ring.

- Jingle bells

112.12 Frame rattles - Rattling objects are attached to a carrier against which they strike.

- Flexatone
- Tambourine (the membrane attached to a number of these also makes them a membranophone)
- Vibraslap

112.121 Pendant rattles.

112.122 Sliding rattles.

112.13 Vessel rattles - Rattling objects enclosed in a vessel strike against each other or against the walls of the vessel, or usually against both.

- Hosho
- Maracas
- Rainstick

112.2 Scraped Idiophones

- Washboard

112.21 Scraped sticks.

112.211 Scraped sticks without resonator.

112.212 Scraped sticks with resonator.

112.22 Scraped tubes.

- Kagul

112.23 Scraped vessels.

- Güiro

112.24 Scraped wheels - cog rattles

- Ratchet

112.3 Split idiophones - Instruments in the shape of two springy arms connected at one end and touching at the other: the arms are forced apart by a little stick, to jangle or vibrate on recoil.

=== Plucked idiophones (12) ===
Instruments set into vibration by plucking. Lamellophones.

==== In the form of a frame (121) ====
121.1 Clack idiophones - The lamella is carved in the surface of a fruit shell, which serves as resonator.

- Cricri

121.2 Guimbardes and Jaw harps - The lamella is mounted in a rod- or plaque-shaped frame and depends on the player's mouth cavity for resonance.

121.21 Idioglot guimbardes - The lamella is of one substance with the frame of the instrument.

- Đàn môi
- Genggong
- Gogona
- Kubing
- Mukkuri

121.22 Heteroglot guimbardes - The lamella is attached to the frame.

121.221 Individual heteroglot guimbardes.

- Jew's harp
- Morsing
- Temir komuz

121.222 Sets of heteroglot guimbardes.

- Kouxian

==== In the form of a comb (122) ====
The lamellae are tied to a board or cut out from a board like the teeth of a comb.

122.1 With laced on lamellae.

- Array mbira
- Agidigbo
- Ikembe (Eleke, Kisanji)
- Kalimba (thumb piano)
- Kasayi
- Marímbula
- Mbira (Sansa, Sanza, Kaffir piano, Likembe)
- Malimbe
- Mechanical music box
- Oopoochawa
- Space Harp (electric thumb piano, Frankiphone)
- Tom
- Zimbabwean Marimba

122.11 Without resonator.

122.12 With resonator.

122.2 With cut-out lamellae

- Comb
- Mechanical music box

=== Friction idiophones (13) ===
Instruments set into vibration by rubbing.

==== Friction sticks (131) ====
131.1 Individual friction sticks.

131.2 Sets of friction sticks.

- Nail violin

131.21 Without direct friction.

131.22 With direct friction.

==== Friction plaques (132) ====
132.1 Individual friction plaques.

- Daxophone
- Musical saw
- Livika

132.2 Sets of friction plaques.

- Marimbaphone

==== Friction vessels (133) ====
133.1 Individual friction vessels.

133.2 Sets of friction vessels.

- Glass harmonica (hydrodaktulopsychicharmonica)
- Glass harp
- Singing bowl
- Verrophone

=== Blown idiophones (14) ===
Instruments set into vibration by blowing or moving air.

==== Blown sticks (141) ====
141.1 Individual blown sticks.

141.2 Sets of blown sticks.

- Aeolsklavier
- Aeolodion

==== Blown plaques (142) ====
142.1 Individual blown plaques.

142.2 Sets of blown plaques.

- Piano chanteur (patented by Gustave Baudet of Paris in 1878)

=== Metal sheets (15) ===
The vibrating material consists of a flexible sheet of metal.

151 Played by friction

- Musical saw (bowed)

152 Directly struck

- Musical saw (hammered)
- Theatrical thunder sheet (played with a hammer)

153 Played by shaking

- Theatrical thunder sheet (played without hammer)
- Wobble board (Australia)

154 Shaken and indirectly struck

- Flexatone

=== Flexed diaphragms (16) ===
A diaphragm is flexed when a string passing through its centre is pulled, before returning to rest. England, modified yoghurt pot or metal watering-can rose mimicking the sound of a clucking cockerel.

=== Shaken springs (17) ===
- Thunder tube

=== Singing idiophones (idiophonic mirlitons) (18) ===
The instrument is made to vibrate by speaking or singing through an aperture into the hollowed space between two opposed and close-fitting concave bodies, forming a valve. The instrument does not yield a note of its own but merely modifies the voice.

=== Unclassified idiophones ===
Idiophones not allocated a number in the Hornbostel-Sachs system.

- Suikinkutsu, a japanese water zither
- Waterphone, an arrangement of rods around a central resonating bowl, played by bowing, shaking, or percussively using sticks or mallets with Superballs on the end
- Shishi-odoshi, a japanese garden ornament
