= List of musical instruments by Hornbostel–Sachs number: 111.1 =

This is a list of instruments by Hornbostel-Sachs number, covering those instruments that are classified under 111 under that system. These instruments are directly struck idiophones.

1: Idiophones. instrument in which the substance of the instrument itself produces sounds, without requiring stretched membranes or strings.

11: Struck idiophones. Instruments that produce sounds through vibration caused by percussion action - hitting, shaking, or scraping.

111: Directly struck idiophones. Instrument that is struck by a player directly; either by mechanical intermediate devices, beaters, keyboards, or by pulling ropes, etc.

111.1: Concussion (clapper) idiophones. Complementary sound producing parts are stuck against each other. Two or more complementary sounding parts are struck against each other.
- Castanets
- Claves
- Clash Cymbals

112: Instrument that is not directly struck by a player; percussion results indirectly by some other movement by the player.

12: Instruments set into vibration by plucking.
13: Instruments in which the substance of the instrument itself produces sounds and are set into vibration by rubbing.
14: Instruments set into vibration by blowing or moving air.
15: Idiophones not allocated a number in the Hornbostel-Sachs system.

2: Instruments in which sound is produced primarily through a vibrating membrane (membranophone). This includes all drums.
3: Instruments in which sound is produced by one or more vibrating strings (chordophones, string instruments).
4: Instruments in which sound is produced through vibrating air (aerophone). This includes wind instruments and free-reed instruments.
5: Instruments that generate their sound electronically (electrophone).
