= List of musical instruments by Hornbostel–Sachs number: 112 =

This is a list of instruments by Hornbostel-Sachs number, covering those instruments that are classified under 112 under that system. These instruments are directly struck idiophones.

1: Idiophones. instrument in which the substance of the instrument itself produces sounds, without requiring stretched membranes or strings.

11: Struck idiophones. Instruments that produce sounds through vibration caused by percussion action - hitting, shaking, or scraping.

111: Directly struck idiophones. Instrument that is struck by a player directly; either by mechanical intermediate devices, beaters, keyboards, or by pulling ropes, etc.
112: Instrument that is not directly struck by a player; percussion results indirectly by some other movement by the player.

- 112.1 Shaken
  - Flexatone
  - Hosho
  - Jingle bells
  - Maracas
  - Rainstick
  - Tambourine
  - Vibraslap
- 112.2 Scraped
  - Güiro
  - Kagul
  - Washboard

12: Instruments set into vibration by plucking.
13: Instruments in which the substance of the instrument itself produces sounds and are set into vibration by rubbing.
14: Instruments set into vibration by blowing or moving air.
15: Idiophones not allocated a number in the Hornbostel-Sachs system.

2: Instruments in which sound is produced primarily through a vibrating membrane (membranophone). This includes all drums.
3: Instruments in which sound is produced by one or more vibrating strings (chordophones, string instruments).
4: Instruments in which sound is produced through vibrating air (aerophone). This includes wind instruments and free-reed instruments.
5: Instruments that generate their sound electronically (electrophone).
