= Nail violin =

Musical instrument

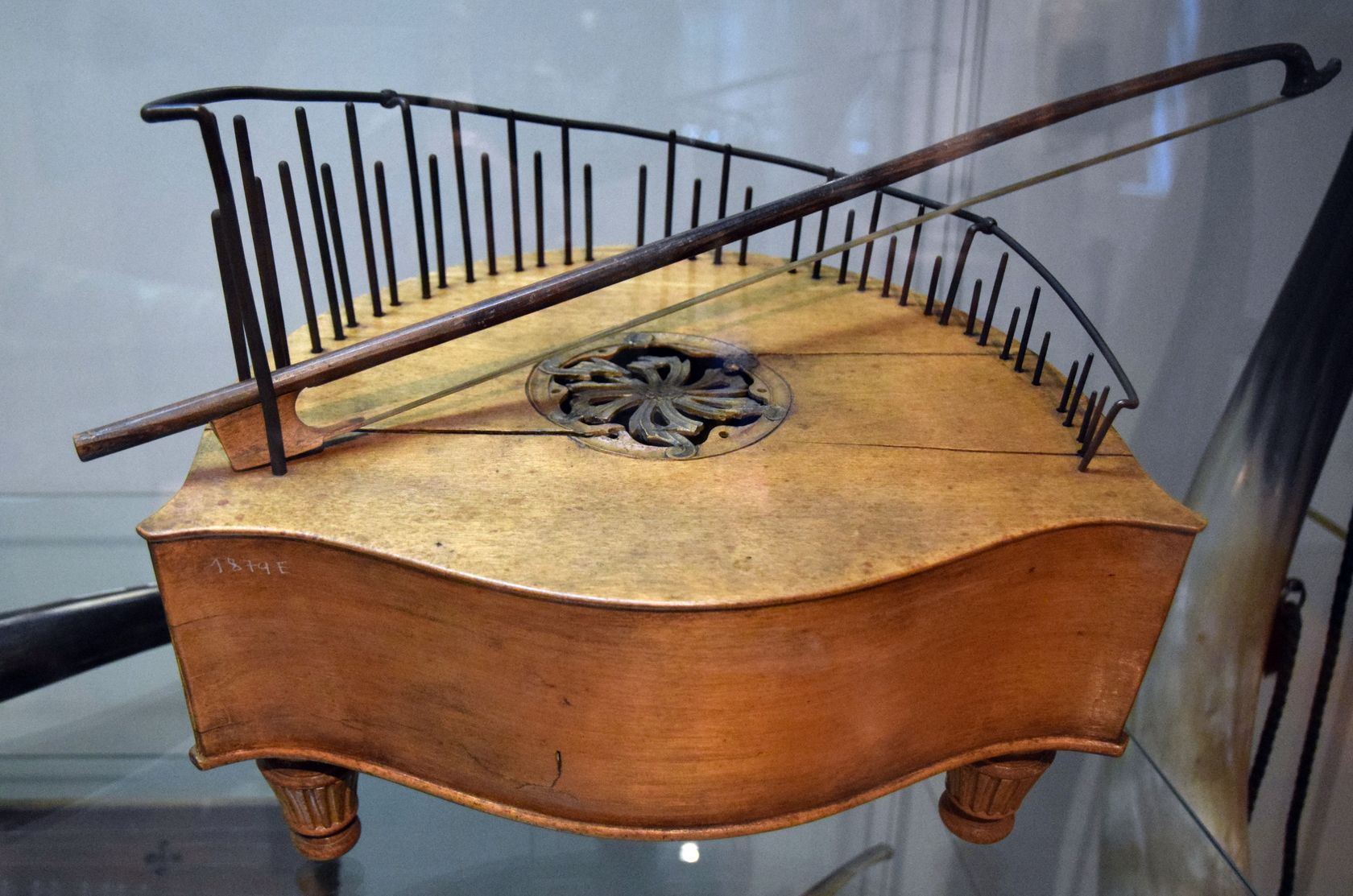
- Nail violin, Bohemia. Czech Museum of Music, Prague
- Other names: Nail harmonica; (Fr.) violon de fer; (Ger.) Nagelgeige, Nagelharmonika, Eisenvioline; (It.) violino di ferro
- Classification: idiophone
- Hornbostel–Sachs classification: 131.2 (Sets of friction sticks)
- Inventor: Johann Wilde
- Developed: 1740

The nail violin is a musical instrument that consists of a semicircular wooden soundboard, with nails of various lengths arranged to produce a chromatic scale when a bow is drawn across them. It was invented in 1740 by German violinist Johann Wilde.

== History ==
Wilde was inspired to create the instrument when he accidentally drew his bow across a metal peg, which produced a musical sound. The instrument consists of a semicircular wooden soundboard, about 1.5 feet (46 cm) by 1 foot (30 cm) in size, with iron or brass nails of different lengths arranged to produce a chromatic scale when bowed; the deeper the nails are driven in, the shorter the nail and the higher the pitch. The bow used was fitted with coarse black horsehair, which produced sound by friction. An improved instrument, now in the collection of the Hochschule in Berlin, has two half-moon sound-chests of different sizes, one on the top of the other, forming terraces. In the rounded wall of the upper sound-chest are two rows of iron staples, the upper giving the diatonic scale, and the lower the intermediate chromatic semitones. The instrument has a sweet bell-like tone but limited technical possibilities.

History records the name of a single virtuoso on this instrument: Senal, a Bohemian musician who travelled all over Germany about 1780–1790. Senal had modified his instrument by adding sympathetic strings, and dubbed this improved version the "violino harmonico".

Several other modifications on Wilde's designs include the use of glass or wooden rods instead of metal nails. Träger of Bernberg (Saxony) created a treadle-operated keyboard version in 1791. The Adiaphonon, created by Franz Schuster in 1818–1819, was similar to the nail violin. It used bowed steel rods and had a six-octave range: F1–F7. A 19th-century version called the Stockspiel or Melkharmonica incorporated wooden rods, which were played using rosined gloves. Bill Wesley invented the Array Nail Violin, in which the notes are arranged according to the Array system. It is played with the fingers, thumbs, and palms dusted with dancer's rosin.

The waterphone works on similar principles, but is atonal rather than chromatic, and has water in its resonator.

== Musical instrument classification ==
The instrument is categorized as a friction idiophone, as it is played by bowing. The instrument can also be played by striking the nails or rods. Michael Meadows has made contemporary copies of the early design of the instrument.

== See also ==
- Daxophone
- Sensitive style
