= Takuapu =

The takuapu (IPA: /takwa'pu /) is a musical percussion instrument used by the indigenous Guaraní people of South America, made from a hollow bamboo tube. The player grasps the takuapu in the middle, holds it vertically, and drops it so that it strikes the ground, producing a deep sound. The name takuapu is a compound of the Guaraní words takua (‘bamboo’) and pu (‘sound’).

A takuapu is up to two meters long and 20 to 30 centimeters in diameter. The varieties of bamboo used are takuára (Guadua angustifolia) and takuarusu (Guadua trinii). All of the inner partitions of the bamboo cane are removed except for the one closest to the ground, producing a hollow tube closed at the bottom. Holes are often drilled in the side of the tube to modify the sound it produces, and sometimes a handful of pebbles are put in the tube to add a rattling sound. When a takuapu is played outdoors or on a dirt floor, a board is often placed on the ground to make the sound louder.

The takuapu was originally played only by women as part of ritual ceremonies of the Guaraní religion that include dances and songs. The singing in the rituals is accompanied by women playing takuaras and men playing mbarakas (maracas). Similar instruments are found elsewhere in South America, usually without the restriction of being played only by women. In Trinidad and Tobago, it is customarily men who play the tamboo bamboo while marching. The band Alba Llaleq from the Formosa Province of Argentina (part of the traditional Guaraní region) include the takuara in their performances.

The takuara is a type of idiophone and can be classified in category 1.11.231 (individual percussion tubes) in the Hornbostel–Sachs classification of musical instruments.

== See also ==
- Ethnomusicology
- Guaraní people
- Tupian languages
- Pai Tavytera
- Toba people
