= Kulintang a tiniok =

Philippine metallophone

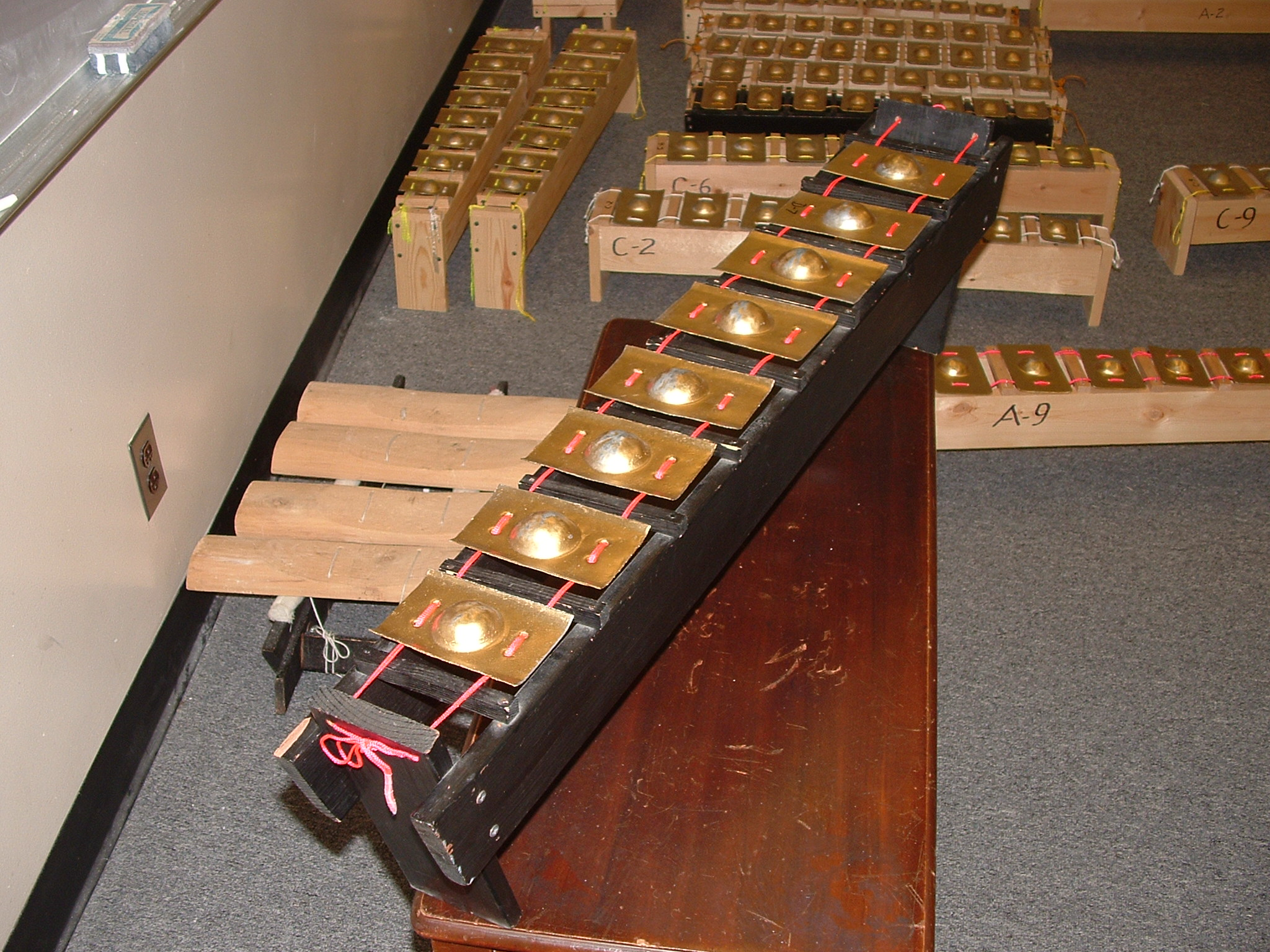
The kulintang a tiniok, a Philippine metallophone of the Maguindanaon people

The kulintang a tiniok is a type of Philippine metallophone with eight tuned knobbed metal plates strung together via string atop a wooden antangan (rack). Kulintang a tiniok is a Maguindanaon term meaning "kulintang with string," but they also could call them kulintang a putao, meaning "kulintang of metal." The Maranao refer to this instrument as a sarunay (or salunay, salonay, saronay, saronai or sarunai), terminology which has become popular for this instrument in North America. This is considered a relatively recent instrument and surprisingly many of them are only made of tin-can. Like the kulintang a kayo, it is used only for self-entertainment purpose in the home, to train beginners on new songs before using the kulintang and in America, master artists have been training students en masse on these instruments.

== See also ==
- Metallophone
