= Gandingan a Kayo =

Philippine xylophone

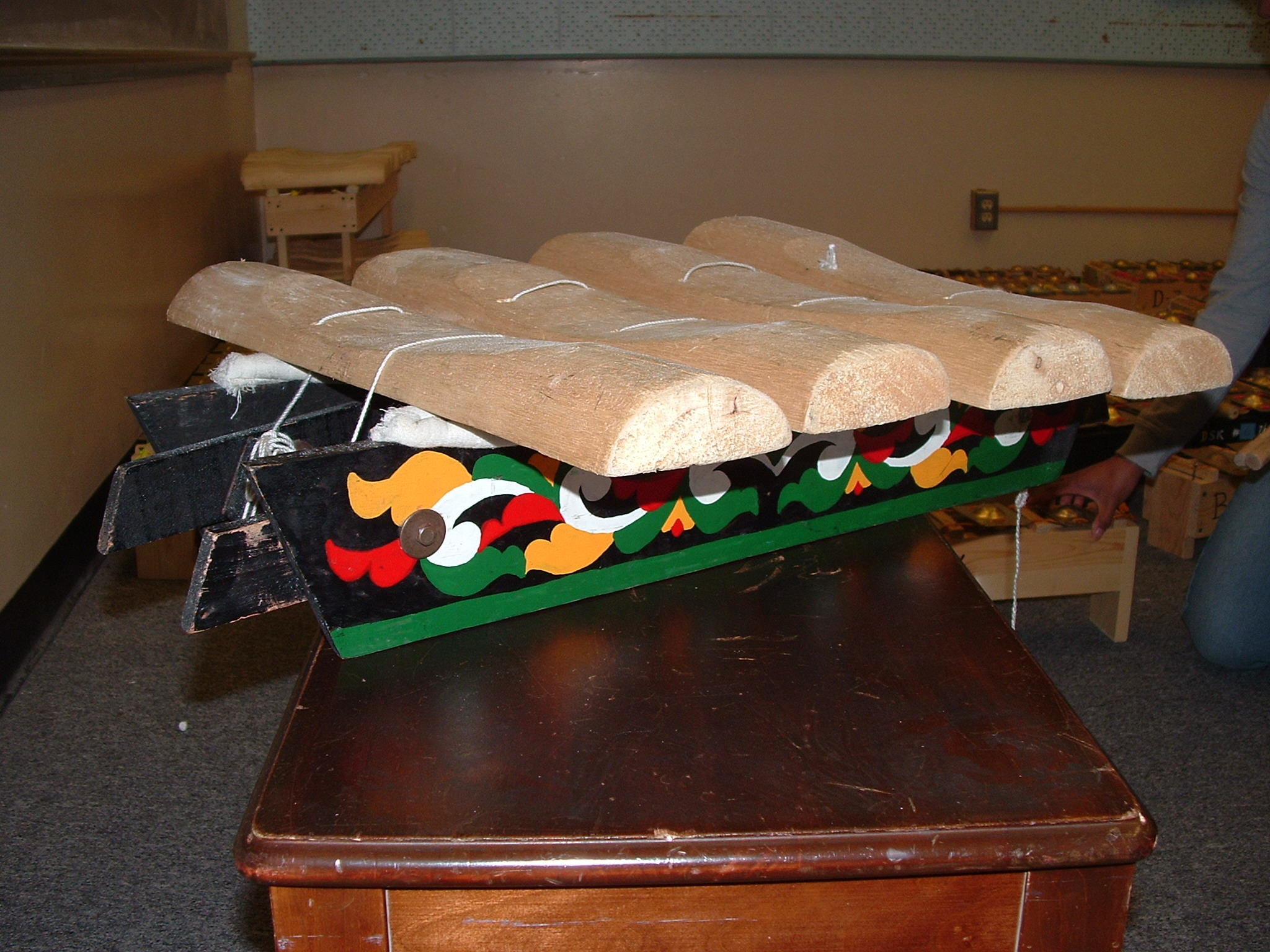
The gandingan a kayo, a Philippine xylophone of the Maguindanaon people

The gandingan a kayo (translated means, “wooden gandingan,” or “gandingan made of wood”) is a Philippine xylophone and considered the wooden version of the real gandingan. This instrument is a relatively new instrument coming of age due to the increasing popularity of the “wooden kulintang ensemble”. Unlike the original gandingan, the gandingan a kayo cannot be used for long-distance communication.

== See also ==
- Xylophone
