= Fangxiang =

Musical instrument

- Drawing of Chinese fangxiang

Metal
- Classification: metallophone
- Hornbostel–Sachs classification: 111.222 (Percussion)
- Developed: 502—557 (Liang dynasty)

Related instruments
- banghyang, hōkyō (kanji: 方響).

The fangxiang (also fang xiang, fang hsiang; simplified Chinese: 方响; traditional Chinese: 方響; pinyin: fāngxiǎng; also known in the West as the Chinese chang) is an organized-suspended (bianxuan) Chinese metallophone that has been used for over 1,000 years. It was first used in the Liang dynasty (502—557 CE), and then standardized in the Sui and Tang dynasties mostly for court music.

== Construction and design ==
A fangxiang consists of 16 tuned rectangular iron, bronze, or jade tuned slabs with 16 different chromatic pitches, laid in a frame in two rows. The slabs are struck with a hammer and played melodically. Unlike the metallophone today, Chinese changed the thickness of the metal plates to obtain different pitches. Each of the slabs is of the same length and width but they are of graduated thickness, with the thicker slabs producing lower tones and the thinner slabs producing higher tones. The method of playing is to beat with a gakteo (hangul: 각퇴, hanja: 角槌) in both hands.

== History ==
In ancient times, the fangxiang was a popular instrument in Chinese court music. It was introduced to Korea, where it is called banghyang (hangul: 방향; hanja: 方響) and is still used in the court music of Korea. A similar instrument used in Japan is called hōkyō (kanji: 方響). The fangxiang first appeared in China in the Liang dynasty, one of the Northern and Southern dynasties (502–557). During the Sui and Tang dynasties (581–840), the instrument became a popular court instrument. There were many famous fangxiang performers at that time, including Xianqi Ma and Bing Wu. Also at that time, many poets created sets of lyrics intended to be accompanied by fangxiang.

Here are two Tang-era poems about the fangxiang:

《方响歌》
Fangxiang Song (Fangxiang Ge)
作者：李沇（唐）
by Li Yan (Tang dynasty)

敲金扣石声相凌，遥空冷静天正澄。
宝瓶下井辘轳急，小娃弄索伤清冰。
穿丝透管音未歇，回风绕指惊泉咽。
季伦怒击珊瑚摧，灵芸整鬓步摇折。
十六叶中侵素光，寒玲震月杂珮珰。
云和不觉罢余怨，莲峰一夜啼琴姜。
急节写商商恨促，秦愁越调逡巡足。
梦入仙楼戛残曲，飞霜棱棱上秋玉。

《方响》
Fangxiang
作者：陆龟蒙（唐）
by Lu Guimeng (Tang dynasty, ?-881)

击霜寒玉乱丁丁，花底秋风拂坐生。
王母闲看汉天子，满猗兰殿佩环声。

== Music contribution ==
In the 1980s, the fangxiang was expanded to include 51 keys. The keys were arranged based on 12-tone equal temperament and double scale arrangement. On the top lane, it is the C# scale, and on the bottom lane it is the C major scale ranging from f to C_{4}. The shelf used for holding those keys can rise up and fall down for the convenience of performing. The new design of the fangxiang sounds clear and melodious, and it is really good for accompaniments in the Chinese traditional orchestra music. For example, in the music "The Great Wall Capriccio", it is used to sound like a bell.

== International development ==
The fangxiang was used by the American composer Lou Harrison in his Music for Violin with Various Instruments: European, Asian and African (1967, revised 1969). Harrison had taken research trips to Japan and South Korea (1961) and Taiwan (1962).
