= Luntang =

Philippine xylophone of the Maguindanao people

The luntang is a type of Philippine xylophone of the Maguindanaon people, strung vertically, with five horizontal logs hung in ascending order arranged by pitch. The Maguindanaon refer to this instrument as a luntang while the Yakan call it a kwintangan kayo. The cylindrical logs are beaten at the edge to create sounds and can be played either solo or with two people on either side. Among the Maguindanaon, the luntang is used only for self-entertainment purposes, to keep farmers awake while at the same time keeping the birds away from the fields. Commonly used for long-distance communication some times ago by the Maguindanaon, the Yakan have taken its use a step further: surprisingly using it for social interactions between sexes as well.

== See also ==
- Xylophone
