= Marimbaphone =

Obsolete tuned percussion instrument

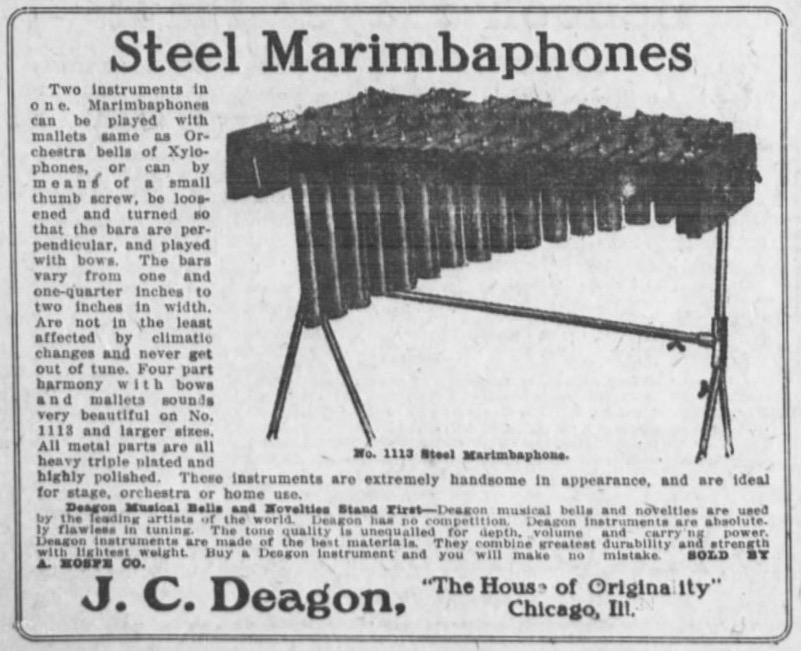
A 1911 advertisement for a marimbaphone

The marimbaphone is an obsolete tuned percussion instrument, developed by J. C. Deagan, Inc., of Chicago, Illinois, in the early 20th century.

== Description ==
The marimbaphone had either shallow steel or wooden bars arranged chromatically with a tube resonator under each bar with wooden bars with resonators shorter than steel bars with resonators sounding its corresponding notes. Its timbre was similar to the celesta for steel and marimba for wooden, and it was used mainly by marimba bands and as a solo instrument by stage artists. It also had an alto version made of steel bars and Tenor version made of nagaed (wooden) bars.

In addition to being played with mallets in the conventional way (as in the playing of a marimba or vibraphone), the marimbaphone was designed so that its bars could be rotated from a horizontal position to a vertical position, allowing them to more easily be played with a bow. To further facilitate bowing, the ends of its bars were shaped to be concave rather than flat. A single marimbaphone could be played by more than one performer, allowing both techniques to be used simultaneously.

Although the instrument has been comparatively little used in art music (Percy Grainger was one of only a few composers ever to call for it), the name is mistakenly written in many scores intending the use of the ordinary marimba rather than the marimbaphone.

== Steel marimba ==
Also invented by Deagan was the steel marimba, a variation on the steel marimbaphone design that was intended to be played strictly with mallets and not bowed. Both of these instruments were superseded by the invention of the vibraphone in 1921.

== See also ==
- Xylorimba
- Tuned percussion
