= Glass marimba =

Type of idiophone

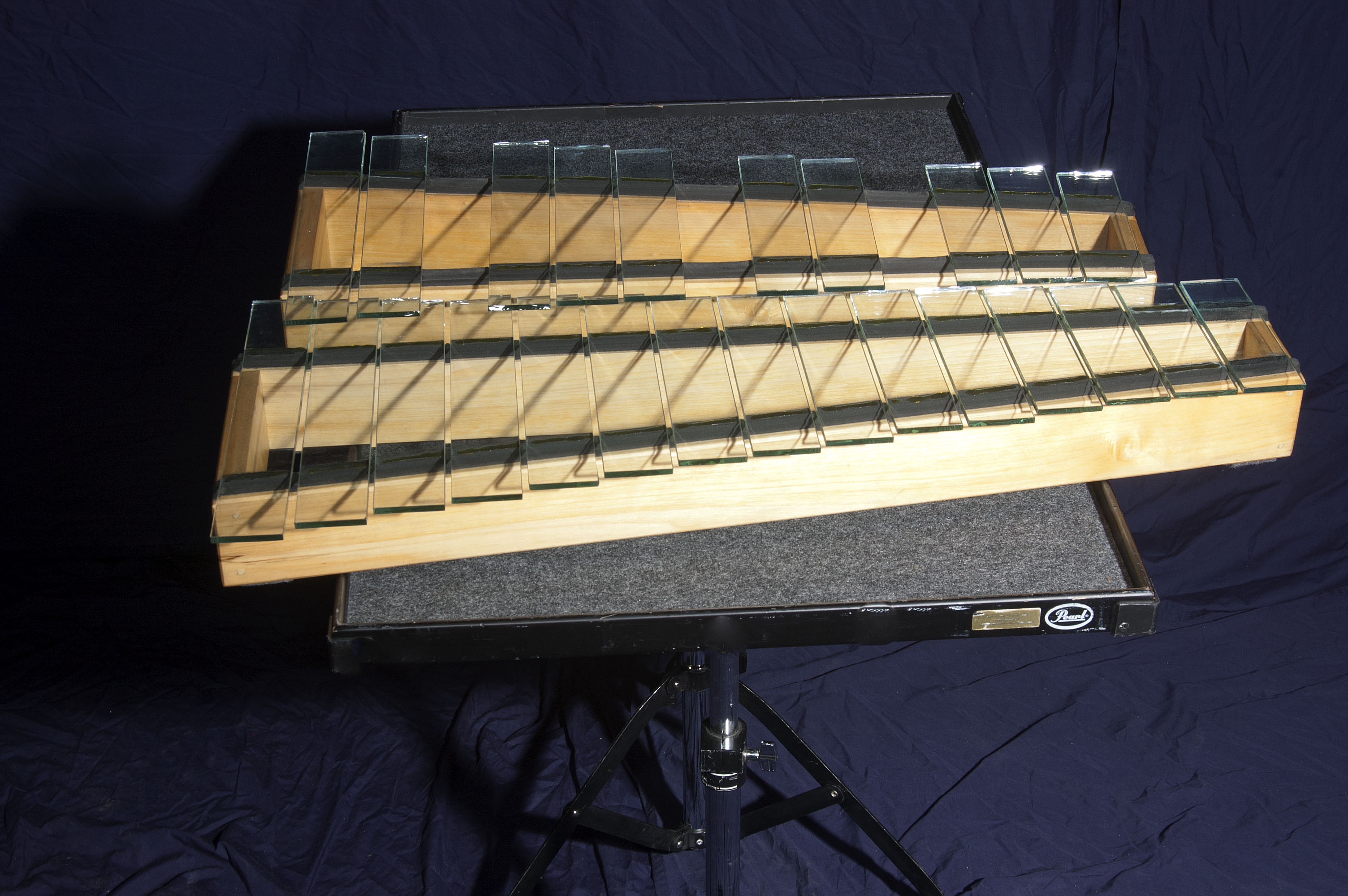
Glass marimba

The glass marimba is a type of idiophone that uses glass structural elements instead of wood. Instruments made with glass are known as crystallophone instruments. Marimba translates to "a xylophone-like instrument" from an African language, probably Bantu. The glass keys are made of either hard glass (plate glass) or soft glass (stained glass). The keys are resonated with either a single open top box or individual resonators for each key. Mallets used to play the marimba can be constructed using a compressed silicone ball (bouncy ball) attached to one end of a wooden or synthetic dowel. These mallets bring out the purest sound from glass marimba. Other types of mallets are used for different effects. The tuning system of a glass marimba can be whatever is desired. Glass marimbas are utilised by the Brazilian percussion ensemble, Uakti.

== Construction ==
Glass marimba can be constructed in a variety of ways.

How one resonates the keys governs the construction method and design.

Resonation can be accomplished using a single resonator which all the keys resonate into, such as an open top box, or individual resonators for each key which can be a tube, box, or sphere. Single box resonators can be constructed from wood, glass, or metal among a variety of materials. Individual resonators can be made from gourds, wood, bamboo, clay, glass, pvc, or metal, to name a few.

The keys also govern the design of the marimba due to the fact that the keys are supported at points called nodes and these dictate the shape of the marimba due to the graduated lengths of the keys and how one supports them. Also, the width of the keys, which can be graduated, determines the overall length.

Keys can be made from plate glass or stained glass. With stained glass, two pieces must be fused together in a kiln to obtain the necessary thickness of 1/4" for the most common glass marimba tunings, though thinner and thicker keys can be used for low and high tunings. Tuning is accomplished most commonly by removing glass from the end of the key which causes the note to go up. Removing glass from the bottom of the key will cause the note to go down but is only feasible if one is using opaque glass for the keys.

The keys are best supported on a pad of open cell foam mounted to a thin piece of wood and encased in cloth.

The keys are attached with double sided clear tape. Silicone glue is also used.

An alternate method of attachment is to use posts between each key on one side and a single post going through a hole in the key on the other side.

Another method glues a piece of hook-and-loop hook tape to the bottom of the bars at the node points, and strips of felt along the top of the resonator box.
