= Gandingan =

Traditional Maguindanao melodic gong set

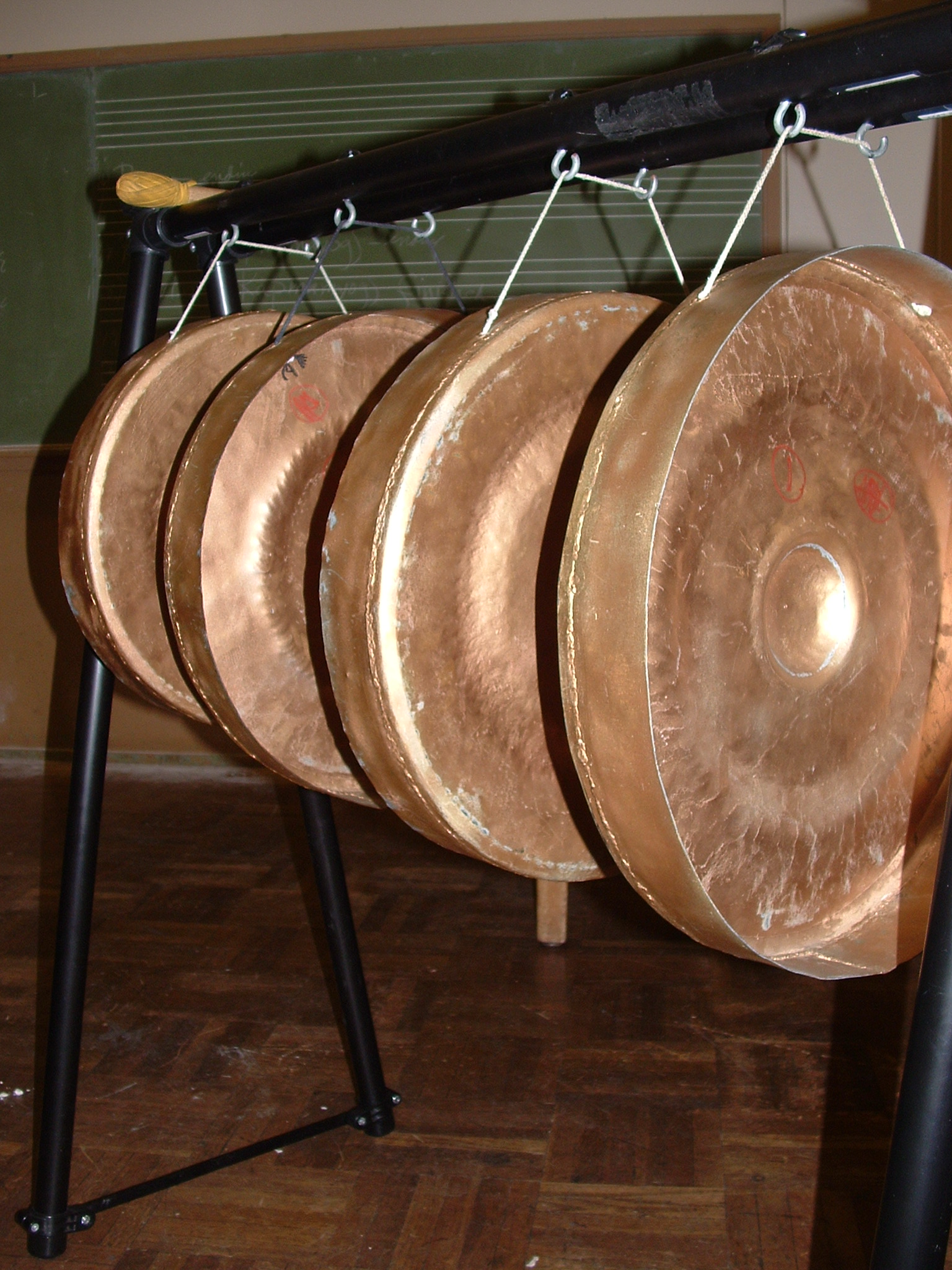
- Classification: Percussion instrument; Idiophone; Gong
- Developed: Indonesia

Related instruments
- kempul, jengglong, gandingan a kayo

The gandingan is a Philippine set of four large, hanging gongs used by the Maguindanao as part of their kulintang ensemble. When integrated into the ensemble, it functions as a secondary melodic instrument after the main melodic instrument, the kulintang. When played solo, the gandingan allows fellow Maguindanao to communicate with each other, allowing them to send messages or warnings via long distances. This ability to imitate tones of the Maguindanao language using this instrument has given the gandingan connotation: the “talking gongs.”

== Description ==
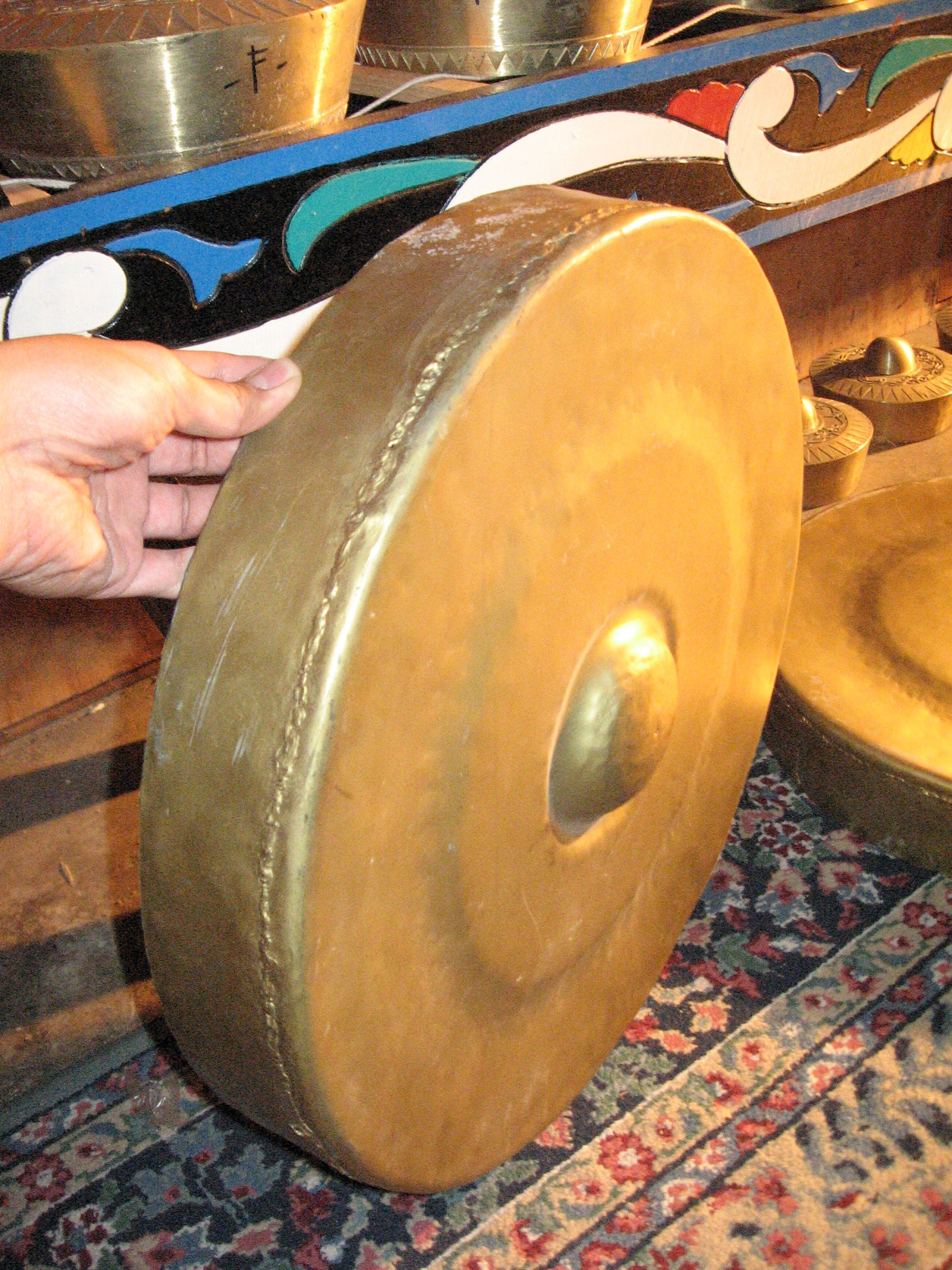
One of the brass gongs of the gandingan

The instrument is usually described as four, large, shallow-bossed, thin-rimmed gongs, vertically hung, either from a strong support such as a tree limb or housed in a strong wooden framed stand. The gongs are arranged in graduated fashion in pairs with knobs of the lower-pitched gongs facing each other and the higher-pitched gongs doing the same. Normally, the lower-pitched gongs would be situated on the left side and the higher pitched gongs on the right side of the player if he/she were right-handed. This arrangement in fact is similar to the arrangement of gongs on the horizontally laid kulintang – so much so, in fact that master musicians say it duplicates the pattern of intervals used on the four lower-pitched gongs of the kulintang.

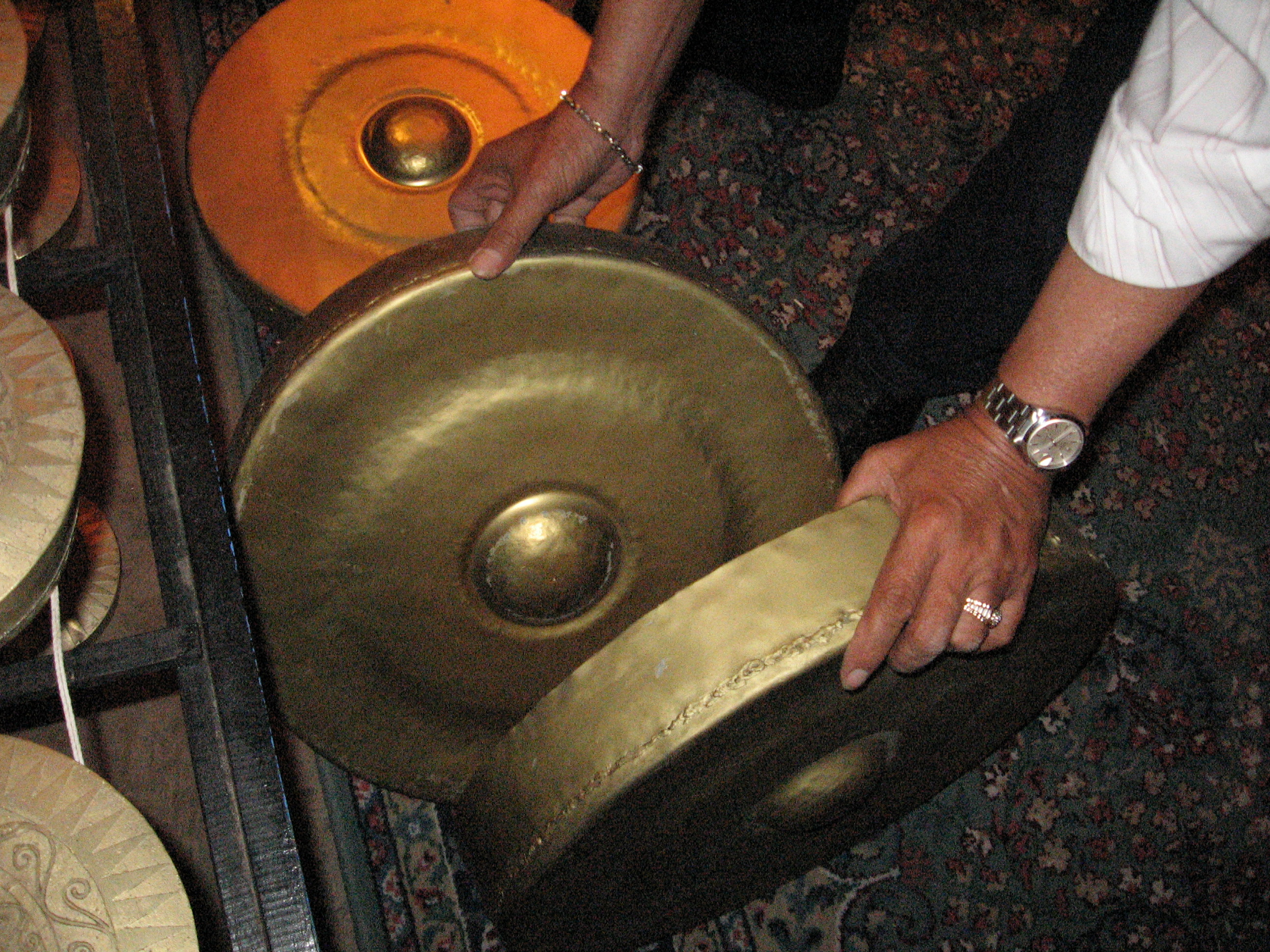
Gandingan gongs placed one inside the other

The gongs, themselves, although variable in pitch, are relatively similar in size. Diameters range from 1.8 to 2 feet and 5 to 8 inches (including the boss) in width for the smallest to largest gongs respectively. Because of their slight differences, smaller gongs could be placed into larger gongs, making transport of these gongs more portable than an agung's, whose turned-in-rim eliminates that possibility.

Traditionally, the metal used for the gandingan was bronze but due to its scarcity after WWII, gandingan are more commonly made of less valuable metals such as steel sheets. Recently, galvanized steel sheets have been used by Maguindanaon instrument manufacturers where different parts of the gong (the knob, body and rim) would be made from separate sheets and welded together, then ground out to produce a finished product. Comparatively, these newer gongs have a higher pitch and are smaller in size than those made in older times.

== Technique ==
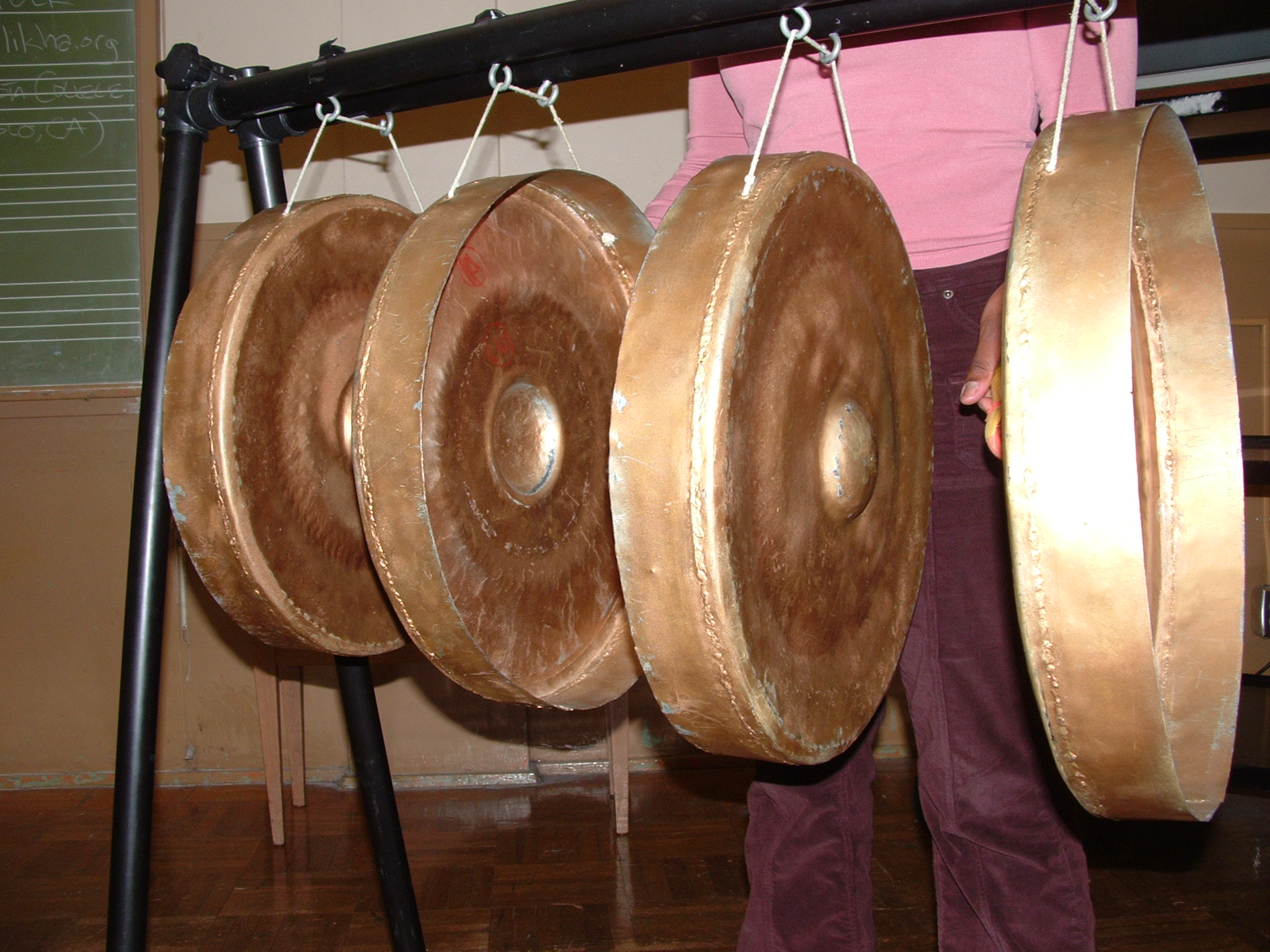
Student demonstrating the proper way to use the gandingan

The gandingan is usually played while standing behind the instrument with the gandingan player holding two wooden mallets. The mallets (balu) are wrapped tightly with strips of rubber at one end and are considered lighter and smaller than those balu used for the agung. The rubber ends of the balu are held between the opposing knobs of the gandingan and the player would use them to strike the knobs to achieve a sound.

Gandingan players can demonstrate different techniques dependent on the occasion. In formal kulintang performances, players would use all four gongs, but during some informal occasions, such as a playing style called apad and kulndet, players would use only three of the highest pitched gongs of the gandingan. And in instances such as gandingan contest, gandingan players may be assisted by two mulits (kulintang assistants) who hold the gongs steadily in place as players ferociously demonstrate their virtuosity on the instrument.

== Uses ==
=== Ensemble ===
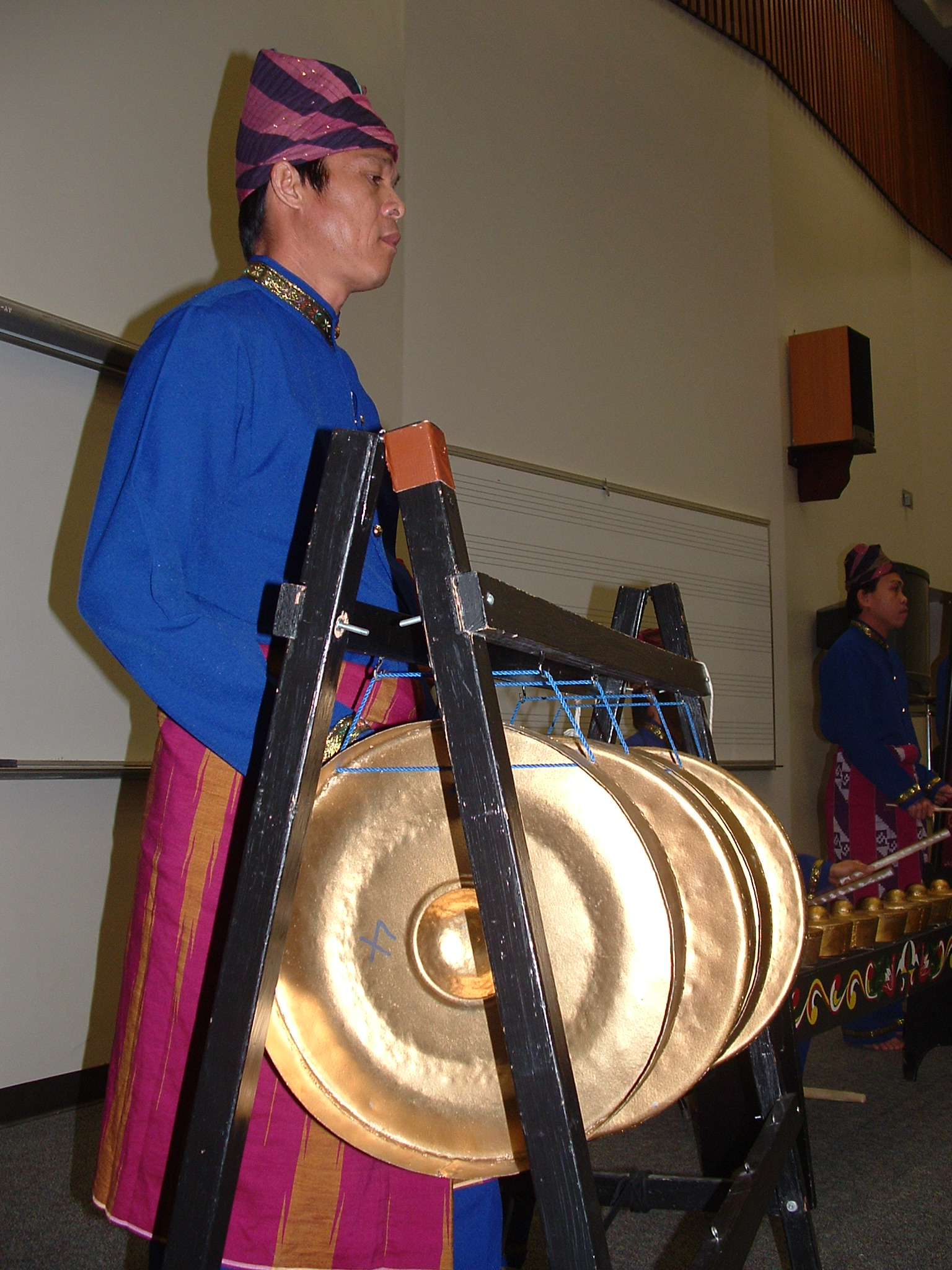
Playing the gandingan as part of the kulintang ensemble

Traditionally among the Maguindanao, the main function of the gandingan was its use as a secondary melodic instrument after the kulintang in the kulintang ensemble. In olden style of play, strictly done by women, the patterns used function to feature/highlight/reinforce the rhythmic modes already established by the singular babendil and dabakan. Women players would use a limited number of patterns that were repeated to provide a sonorous foundation to the entire ensemble.

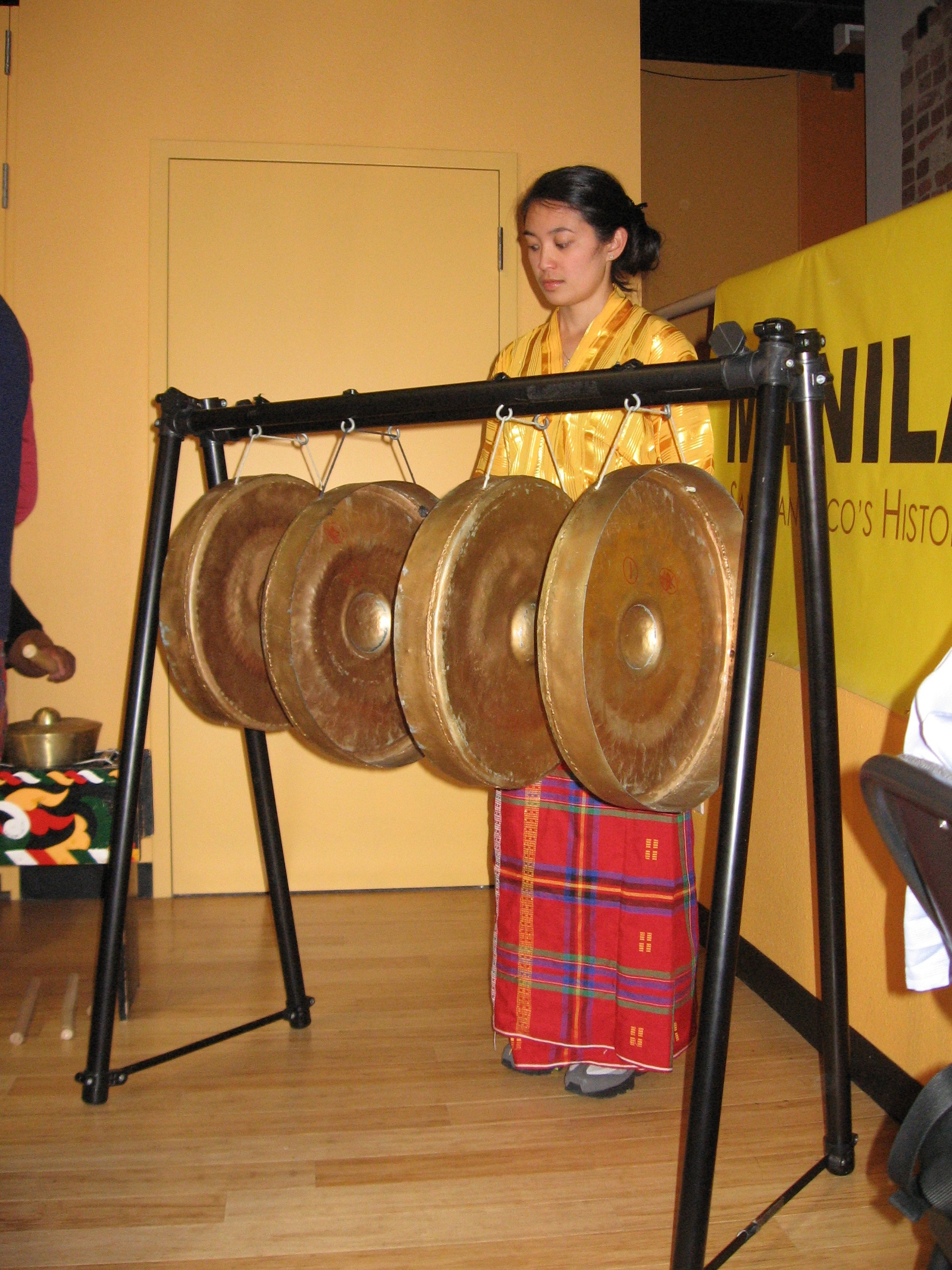
Traditionally, women were only ones allowed to play the gandingan

=== Contest ===
Newer styles of play have recently emerged, pushing the bounds of what the gandingan was traditionally used for. One type of play called kulndet requires players to perform highly dense, complicated rhythmic patterns upon the gandingan. This type of play unlike the olden (kamamatuan) style of gandingan playing requires assistants to hold the gongs to avoid long suspensions of sound. Because of the strenuous type of play, male musicians usually perform this style during contests held at weddings where players would demonstrate their virtuosity, considered a sign of masculinity, on the gandingan. During a gandingan contest, two expert gandingan players (pagaganding) would play a particular piece several times in rotation with each other. This type of play is said to have evolved from the spread of virtuosic style on the agung.

=== Communication ===
Another type of play, called apad, is used for conveying linguistic messages from one player to another. This ability to mimic the intonations of the Maguindanao language on the three highest-tuned gongs has dubbed the gandingan as the talking gongs.

Traditionally, because of strict rules forbidding direct conversational interactions between the sexes, the gandingan presented a means for teenagers to interact with one another. Using the gandingan, young men and women would spend hours teasing, flirting, gossiping, playing guessing games, trading friendly insults and simply conversing with one another. For instance, if friends were telling a boy that a girl liked him but the boy didn't like her back, the boy wouldn't resort to telling his friends literally he didn't like her. Instead, he could use the gandingan to express his reasons and his friends would be able to pick up the message by translating his song.

In fact, during the 1950s, many families would intentionally hang gandingans outside their houses so other neighbors could easily hear them play. Young men would gather around the gandingan and gossip about people they dislike, usually “chatting” with other gandingan players further away. Locals says much of this jovial talk even contained sexual innuendoes, where all kinds of dirty words could be heard penetrating the night air.

Gandingans were also used by a young man and woman who were having strong feelings for one another and if the feelings were just right, the couple would elope with one another. For instance, if the young man wanted to ask the young women “to come here,” the man would play on the gandingan, “Singkaden Ka Singkaden.” Another common message couples would play is, “Pagngapan ko seka,” literally meaning, “I am waiting for you.”

Along with those trivial messages, gandingans were also used in more seriously matters when signaling to others of imminent danger. During martial law, gandingans were used to warn villagers of incoming Marcos’ soldiers. Every time the villagers received the signal, they would disappear leaving the soldiers aloof until the soldiers themselves brought in a translator who told them, the gandingan was responsible for the scurry. So they arrested the gandingan player. A similar story talks about a brother of a man who stole someone's carabao. In order to keep his brother from getting arrested, the brother set up a gandingan up in a tree and would clang it every time the police arrived to warn his brother to leave their house. But like Marcos’ soldiers, the police bought a translator and so they were finally able to arrest the theft for stealing and the brother on the gandingan for obstruction of justice.

== Origin ==
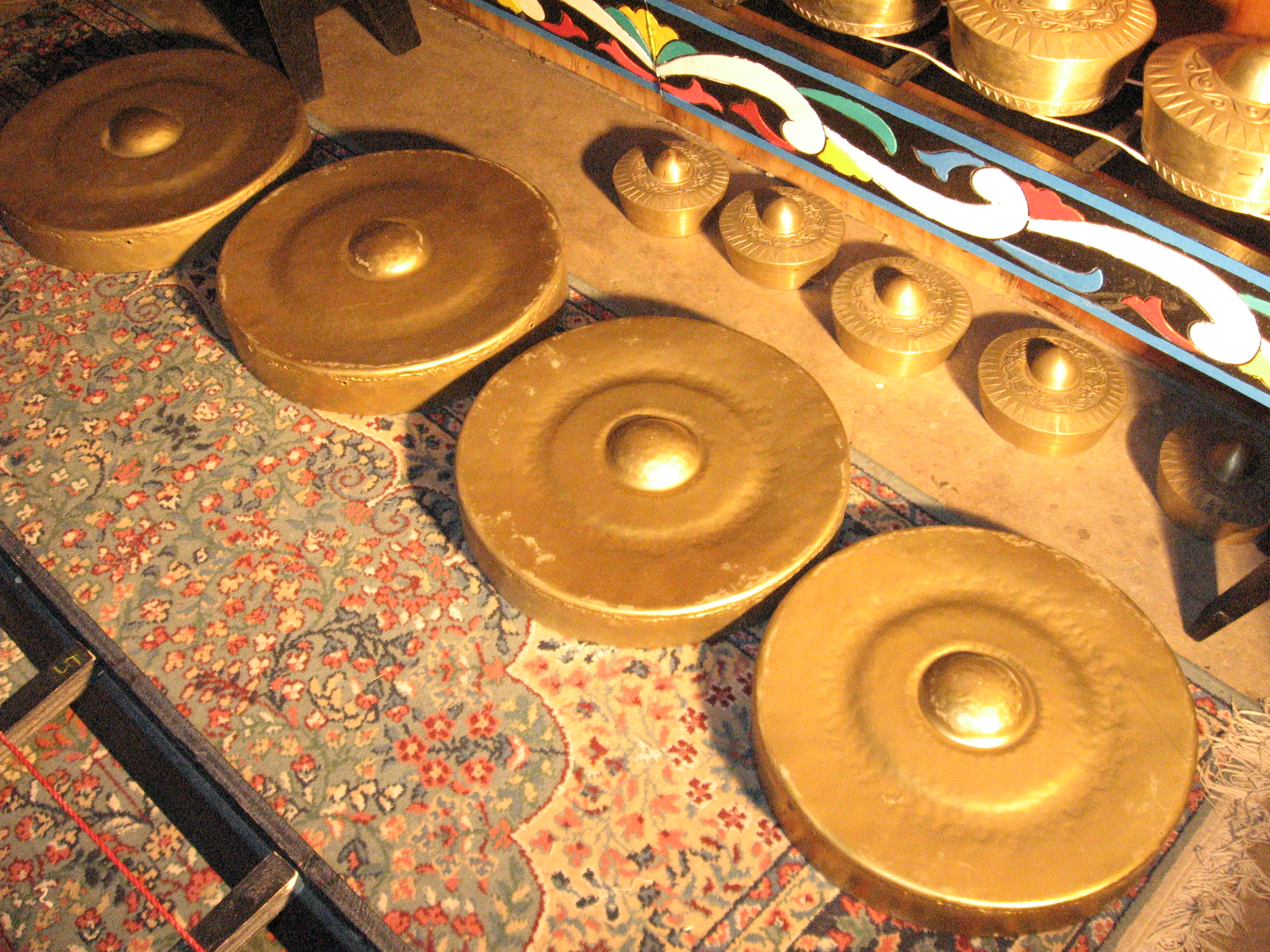
Gandingan

The etymology of the term, “gandingan,” is unknown but it appears in many Maguindanao folk tales and epics. For instance, one folk tale states the Malailai Gandingan is a place known for a powerful sultan and his beautiful daughter while in another epic, Raja sa Madaya, Gandingan is the proper name of a place where hostile datus (who attempted to abduct a princess from the prince of Madaya) live. Perhaps the most significant mention of the gandingan in an epic tale is in the Maguindanao epic Diwatakasalipan, where word “gandingan” actually refers to the instrument itself. In the epic, a young princess, Tintingan na Bulawan, uses the gandingan to inform her sister, Initulon na Gambal, about a hero prince, Diwatakasalipan, who was looking for a wife. Thanks to that message, Initulon na Gambal was able to entertain the hero prince using a kulintang into her heart. This use of the gandingan in this epic exemplifies that its use as a form of communication was pre-Islamic in origin.

The origins of the gongs themselves are still disputed by scholars. It is likely, as observed by Thomas Forrest, a British explorer, that gongs without knobs on them (like the gandingan) came from China. However, other sources suggest the gandingan came to the Philippines via Indonesia or Malaysian Sarawak due to similar gandingan-type instruments found among the Tausug of Sulu.

== Similar instruments ==
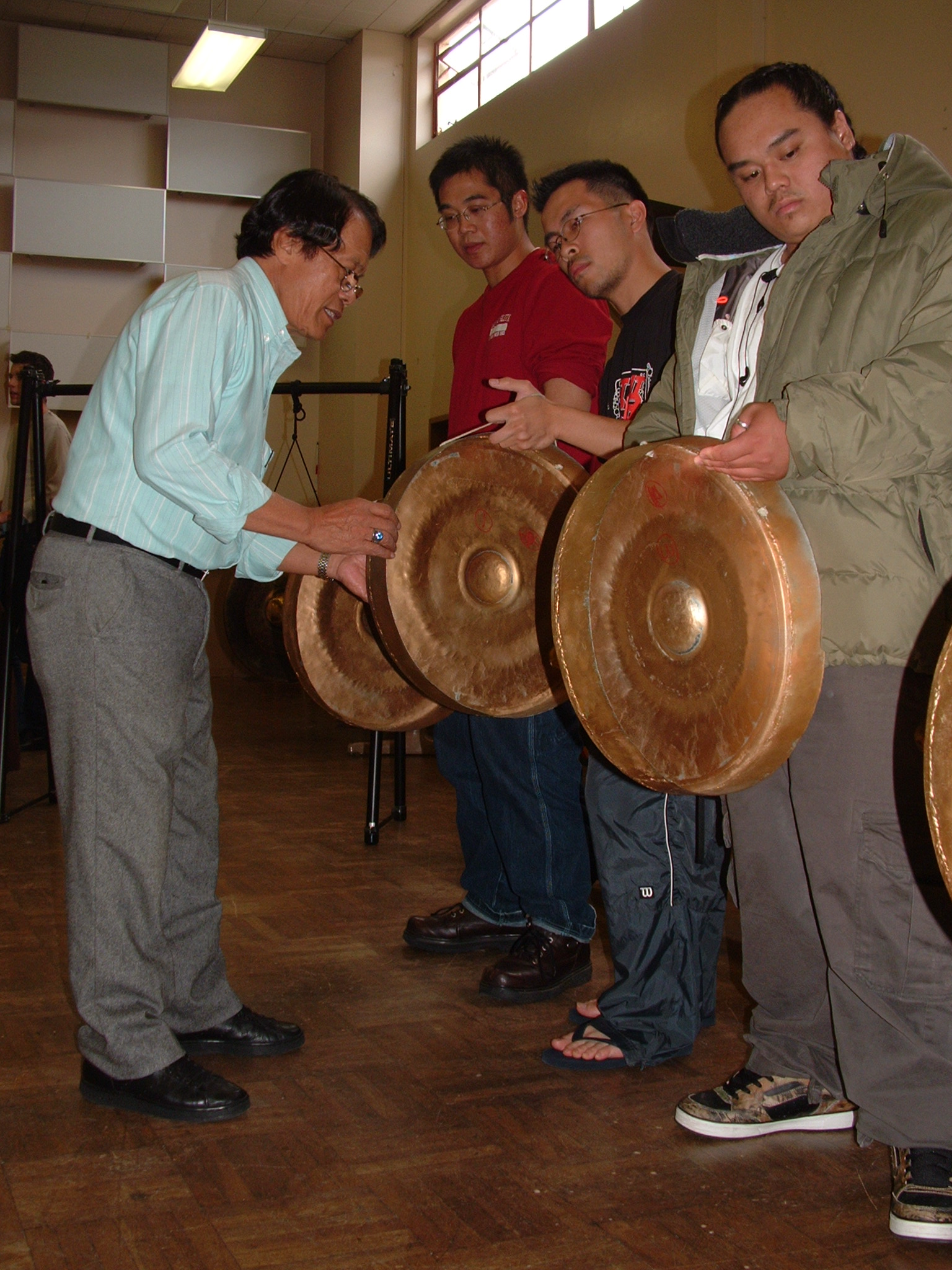
Using the gandingan in substitute of the karatung of the Tiruray

The set of four, large hanging gongs is confined mainly to the Maguindanao. Scholars says the Maranao once used the gandingan but the instrument has disappeared from usage in Maranao ensembles of today. The Tausug have a gandingan-type gong with a narrow-rim called a buahan or huhagan, one of the three agungs used in the Tausug kulintang ensemble. The Samal have something similar called a bua. Other gongs similar to the gandingan are the handheld gongs of the Subanon (gagung sua) and Tiruray (karatung) used in their agung ensembles, the latter group sometimes substituting Maguindanao gandingan gongs for their karatungs.
