= List of membranophones by Hornbostel–Sachs number =

The Hornbostel-Sachs system of musical instrument classification groups all instruments in which sound is produced primarily through a vibrating membrane. This includes all drums.

== Membranophones (2) ==
=== Struck membranophones (21) ===
Struck drums - instruments which have a struck membrane. This includes most types of drum, such as the timpani and snare drum.

==== Directly struck membranophones (211) ====
Instruments in which the membrane is struck directly, such as through bare hands, beaters or keyboards

211.1 Instruments in which the body of the drum is dish- or bowl-shaped (kettle drums)

211.11 Single instruments

- Tamak'
- Timpani

211.12 Sets of instruments

- Tabla

211.2 Instruments in which the body is tubular (tubular drums)

211.21 Instruments in which the body has the same diameter at the middle and end (cylindrical drums)

211.211 Instruments which have only one usable membrane

211.211.1 Instruments in which the end without a membrane is open

- Octoban

211.211.2 Instruments in which the end without a membrane is closed

211.212 Instruments which have two usable membranes

- Tumdak'

211.212.1 Single instruments

- Bass drum
- Dunun
- Snare drum
- Tom-tom

211.212.2 Sets of instruments

211.22 Instruments in which the body is barrel-shaped (barrel drums)

211.221 Instruments which have only one usable membrane

211.221.1 Instruments in which the end without a membrane is open

- Conga

211.221.2 Instruments in which the end without a membrane is closed

211.222 Instruments which have two usable membranes

211.222.1 Single instruments

- Taiko - this term refers to any of the various Japanese drums.
  - Byō-uchi-daiko
  - Shime-daiko
  - Okedō-daiko
  - Gagakki
  - Nagadō-daiko

211.222.2 Sets of instruments

211.23 Instruments in which the body is double-conical

211.231 Instruments which have only one usable membrane

211.231.1 Instruments in which the end without a membrane is open

211.231.2 Instruments in which the end without a membrane is closed

211.232 Instruments which have two usable membranes

211.232.1 Single instruments

211.232.2 Sets of instruments

211.24 Instruments in which the body is hourglass-shaped

211.241 Instruments which have only one usable membrane

211.241.1 Instruments in which the end without a membrane is open

211.241.2 Instruments in which the end without a membrane is closed

211.242 Instruments which have two usable membranes

211.242.1 Single instruments

211.242.2 Sets of instruments

211.25 Instruments in which the body is conical-shaped (conical drums)

211.251 Instruments which have only one usable membrane

211.251.1 Instruments in which the end without a membrane is open

- Bongo drum

211.251.2 Instruments in which the end without a membrane is closed

211.252 Instruments which have two usable membranes

211.252.1 Single instruments

211.252.2 Sets of instruments

211.26 Instruments in which the body is goblet-shaped (goblet drums)

211.261 Instruments which have only one usable membrane

211.261.1 Instruments in which the end without a membrane is open

- Djembe

211.261.2 Instruments in which the end without a membrane is closed

- Dabakan

211.262 Instruments which have two usable membranes

211.262.1 Single instruments

211.262.2 Sets of instruments

211.3 Instruments in which the body depth is not greater than the radius of the membrane (frame drums)

- Tambourine (the jingles also make this an idiophone)

211.31 Instruments which do not have a handle

211.311 Instruments which have only one usable membrane

211.312 Instruments which have two usable membranes

211.32 Instruments which have a handle

211.321 Instruments which have only one usable membrane

- Bodhrán

211.322 Instruments which have two usable membranes

==== Shaken membranophones (212) ====
Instruments which are shaken, the membrane being vibrated by objects inside the drum (rattle drums)

=== Plucked membranophones (22) ===
Instruments with a string attached to the membrane, so that when the string is plucked, the membrane vibrates (plucked drums). Some commentators believe that instruments in this class ought instead to be regarded as chordophones.

=== Friction membranophones (23) ===
Instruments in which the membrane vibrates as a result of friction. With friction drums, the sound is produced rubbing, rather than striking.

==== Friction drums with stick (231) ====
Instruments in which the membrane is vibrated from a stick that is rubbed or used to rub the membrane

231.1 Instruments in which the stick is inserted in a hole in the membrane

231.11 Instruments in which the stick can not be moved and is subject to rubbing, causing friction on the membrane

- Cuíca
- Rommelpot

231.12 Instruments in which the stick is semi-movable, and can be used to rub the membrane

231.13 Instruments in which the stick is freely movable, and is used to rub the membrane

231.2 Instruments in which the stick is tied upright to the membrane

==== Friction drum with cord (232) ====
Instruments in which a cord, attached to the membrane, is rubbed

232.1 Instruments in which the drum is held stationary while playing

232.11 Instruments which have only one usable membrane

- Buhay
- Cuíca

232.12 Instruments which have two usable membranes

232.2 Instruments in which the drum is twirled by a cord, which rubs in a notch on the stick held by the player

==== Hand friction drums (233) ====
Instruments in which the membrane is rubbed by hand

=== Singing membranes (kazoos) (24) ===
This group includes kazoos, instruments which do not produce sound of their own, but modify other sounds by way of a vibrating membrane.

==== Free kazoos (241) ====
Instruments in which the membrane is vibrated by an unbroken column of wind, without a chamber

==== Tube or vessel kazoos (242) ====
Instruments in which the membrane is placed in a box, tube or other container

- Kazoos
- Eunuch flute

=== Unclassified membranophones (25) ===
These instruments may be classified with a suffix, depending on how the membrane is attached to the body:

- 6: Membrane glued to the body
- 7: Membrane nailed to the body
- 8: Membrane laced to the body
  - 81: Lacing is cord- or ribbon-bracing, in which the cords stretch between membranes or in the form of a net
    - 811: Lacing does not use a special device to stretch the cords
    - 812: The middle of the lacing has ribbons or cords tied crossways to increase the tension of the lacing (tension ligature)
    - 813: The lacing is zigzag, with every pair of strings attached to a ring or hoop (tension loop)
    - 814: Wedges, placed between the body and the lacing, can be used to alter the tension by adjusting the positioning of the wedges
  - 82: The lacing at the lower end is attached to a non-sonorous hide
    - 821: Lacing does not use a special device to stretch the cords
    - 822: The middle of the lacing has ribbons or cords tied crossways to increase the tension of the lacing (tension ligature)
    - 823: The lacing is zigzag, with every pair of strings attached to a ring or hoop (tension loop)
    - 824: Wedges, placed between the body and the lacing, can be used to alter the tension by adjusting the positioning of the wedges
  - 83: The lacing at the lower end is attached to an auxiliary board
    - 831: Lacing does not use a special device to stretch the cords
    - 832: The middle of the lacing has ribbons or cords tied crossways to increase the tension of the lacing (tension ligature)
    - 833: The lacing is zigzag, with every pair of strings attached to a ring or hoop (tension loop)
    - 834: Wedges, placed between the body and the lacing, can be used to alter the tension by adjusting the positioning of the wedges
  - 84: The lacing at the lower end is attached to flange, carved from a solid block
    - 841: Lacing does not use a special device to stretch the cords
    - 842: The middle of the lacing has ribbons or cords tied crossways to increase the tension of the lacing (tension ligature)
    - 843: The lacing is zigzag, with every pair of strings attached to a ring or hoop (tension loop)
    - 844: Wedges, placed between the body and the lacing, can be used to alter the tension by adjusting the positioning of the wedges
  - 85: The lacing at the lower end is attached to a belt
    - 851: Lacing does not use a special device to stretch the cords
    - 852: The middle of the lacing has ribbons or cords tied crossways to increase the tension of the lacing (tension ligature)
    - 853: The lacing is zigzag, with every pair of strings attached to a ring or hoop (tension loop)
    - 854: Wedges, placed between the body and the lacing, can be used to alter the tension by adjusting the positioning of the wedges
  - 86: The lacing at the lower end is attached to pegs inserted in the body of the drum
    - 861: Lacing does not use a special device to stretch the cords
    - 862: The middle of the lacing has ribbons or cords tied crossways to increase the tension of the lacing (tension ligature)
    - 863: The lacing is zigzag, with every pair of strings attached to a ring or hoop (tension loop)
    - 864: Wedges, placed between the body and the lacing, can be used to alter the tension by adjusting the positioning of the wedges
- 9: Membrane is bound to the body with a ring slipped on top of it
  - 91: Membrane is attached by a ring made of cord
  - 92: Membrane is attached by a ring made of a hoop
    - 921: Drum has no mechanism
    - 922: Drum has mechanism
      - 9221: Drum has no pedals
      - 9222: Drum has pedals
