= Kulintang a kayo =

Philippine xylophone

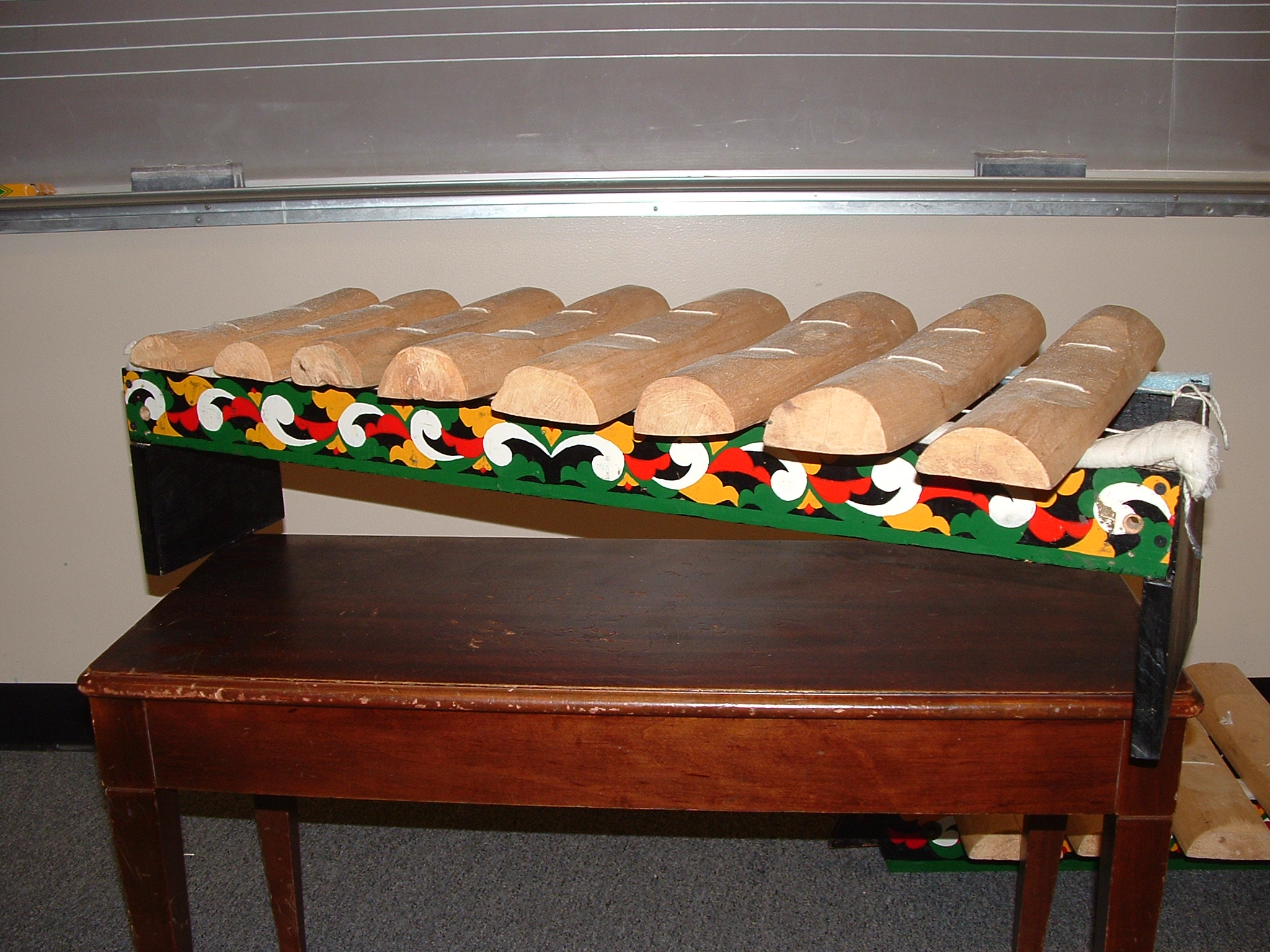
The kulintang a kayo

The kulintang a kayo (literally, “wooden kulintang”) is a Philippine xylophone of the Maguindanaon people with eight tuned slabs strung horizontally atop a padded wooden antangan (rack). Made of hand-carved soft wood such as bayug (genus Pterospermum) or more likely tamnag (genus unknown), the kulintang a kayo is rarely found except in Maguindanaon households which have a strong kulintang musical heritage. Traditionally, this homemade instrument was used for self-entertainment purposes inside the house, so that beginning musicians could practice kulintang pieces before performing them on the full-sized metal kulintang sets. Only recently have these instruments been used as part of a wooden kulintang ensemble. This ancient instrument is considered to have existed in the Philippines before the importation of metal gongs from China and therefore is considered a precursor to the present-day kulintang.
