= Kagul =

Philippine bamboo scraper gong/slit drum

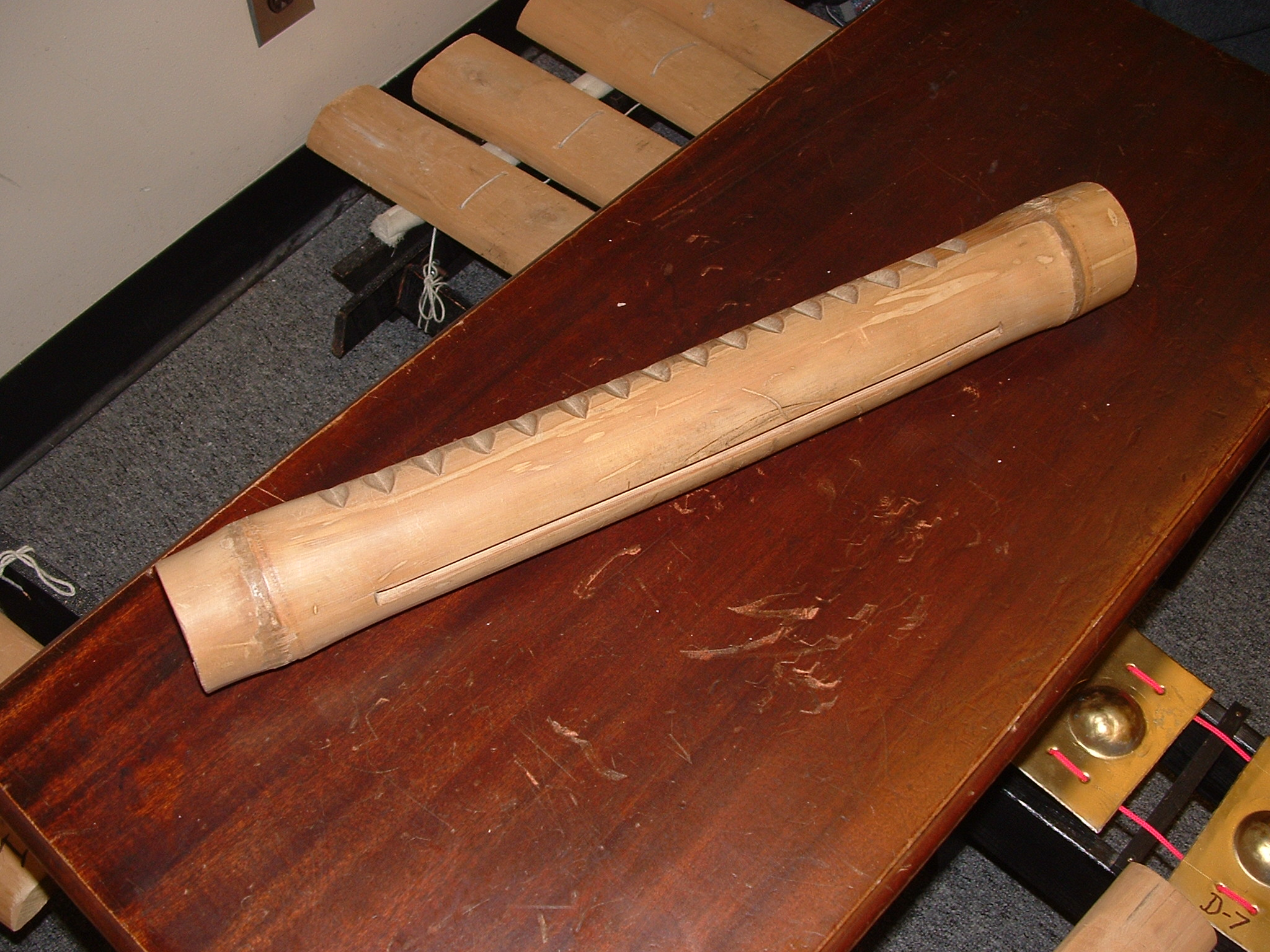
A kagul, a Philippine bamboo scraper gong/slit drum of the Maguindanaon people

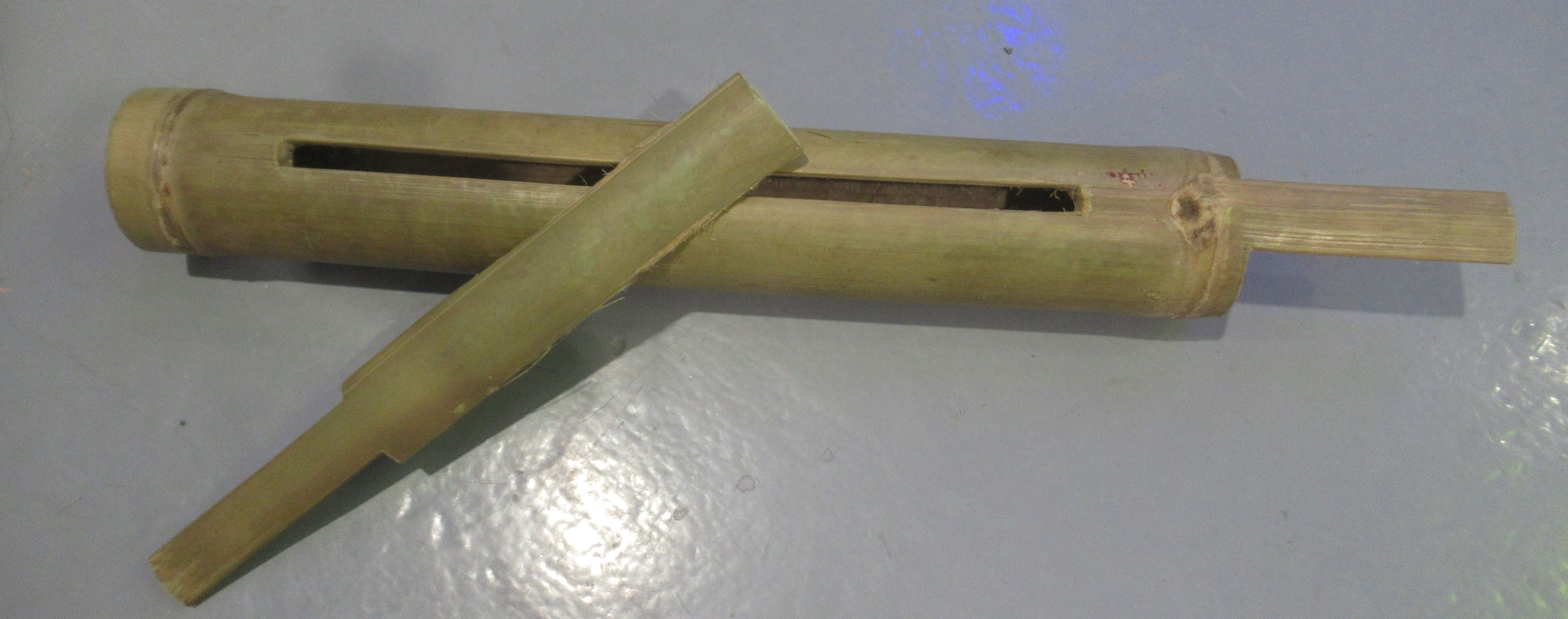
Bantula

The kagul is a type of Philippine bamboo scraper gong/slit drum of the Maguindanaon and Visayans with a jagged edge on one side, played with two beaters, one scraping the jagged edge and the other one making a beat. The Maguindanaon and the Banuwaen use it in the rice paddies to guard against voracious birds, using the sound it produces to scare them away. The Maguindanaon and the indigenous inhabitants of Bukidnon also used to use it for simple dance rhythms during social occasions. The rhythms were usually simplistic in nature, consisting of one rhythmic pattern sometimes combined with another. Use of the kagul in the former way is no longer practiced.

Also called tagutok (Maranao), bantula or tagungtung (Bukidnon) and kuratung (Banuwaen).

== See also ==
- Slim (musical instrument)
