= List of gamelan varieties =

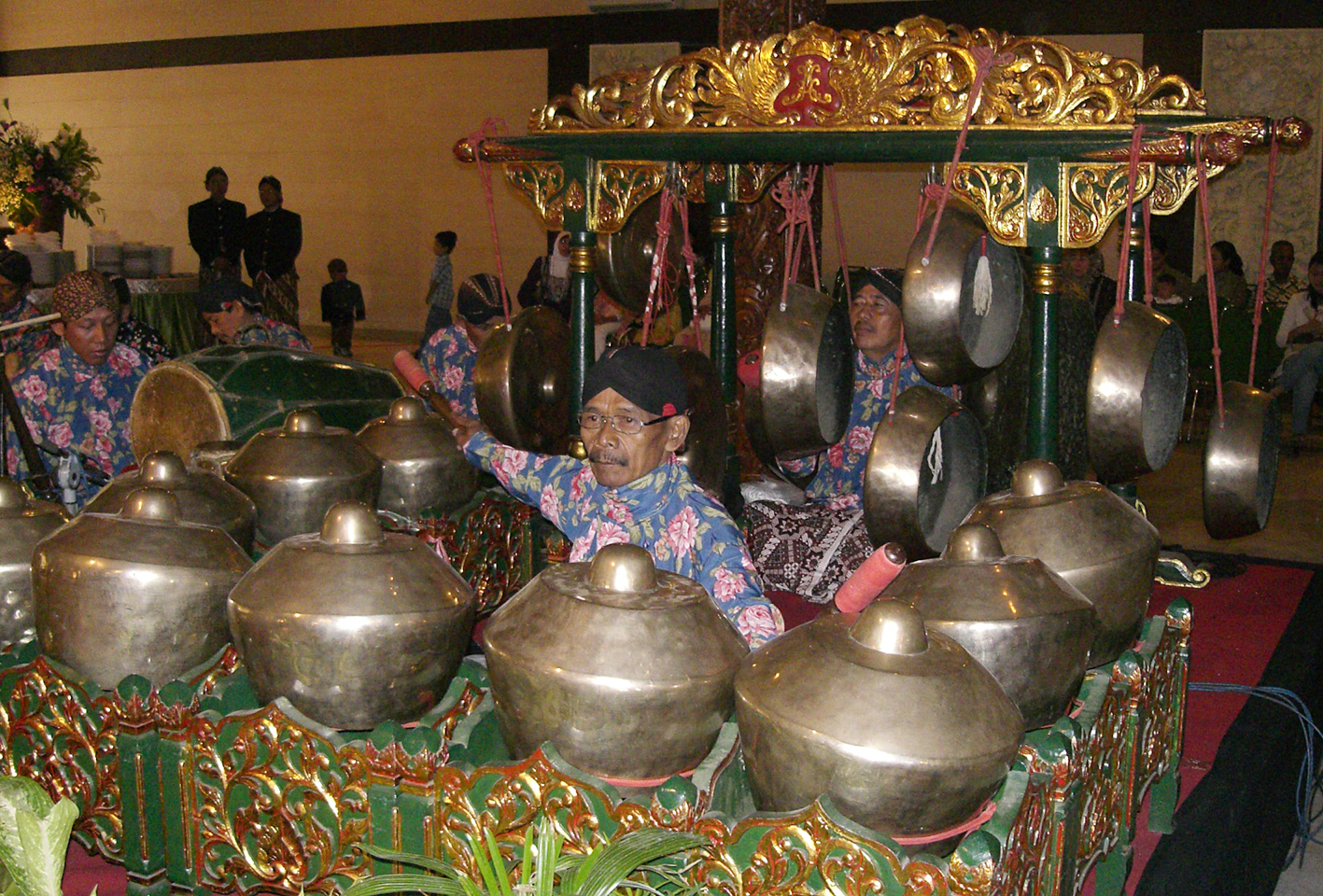
Gamelan instruments

This is a list of gamelan varieties.

== Javanese gamelan varieties ==
- Gamelan Kodok Ngorek
- Gamelan Munggang
- Gamelan Sekaten
- Gamelan Carabalen
- Gamelan gadhon
- Gamelan siteran
- Gamelan wayangan
- Bamboo gamelan
- Gamelan prawa
- Gamelan pelog
- Gamelan Renteng
- Gamelan Sekati
- Gamelan Degung
- Gamelan kedempling
- Gamelan Banyuwangi
- Gamelan Madura

== Balinese gamelan varieties ==
- Gamelan angklung
- Gamelan batel
- Gamelan bebonangan
- Gamelan beleganjur
- Gamelan gambang
- Gamelan gambuh
- Gamelan gandrung
- Gamelan gender wayang
- Gamelan gong gede
- Gamelan gong kebyar
- Gamelan gong luang
- Gamelan gong saron
- Gamelan gong suling
- Gamelan jegog
- Gamelan joged bumbung
- Gamelan pearjaan
- Gamelan pelegongan
- Gamelan selunding
- Gamelan semar pegulingan
- Gamelan semarandana
- Gamelan trompong beruk
- Gamelan tembang girang

== Sundanese gamelan varieties ==
- Gamelan Degung
- Gamelan Jaipongan
- Gamelan Kliningan
- Gamelan Salendro
- Gamelan Kecapi suling
- Gamelan Tembang sunda

== See also ==
- Music of Indonesia
- Music of Java
- Music of Bali
