= Gamelan Sekar Jaya =

Balinese gamelan ensemble in the San Francisco Bay Area, US

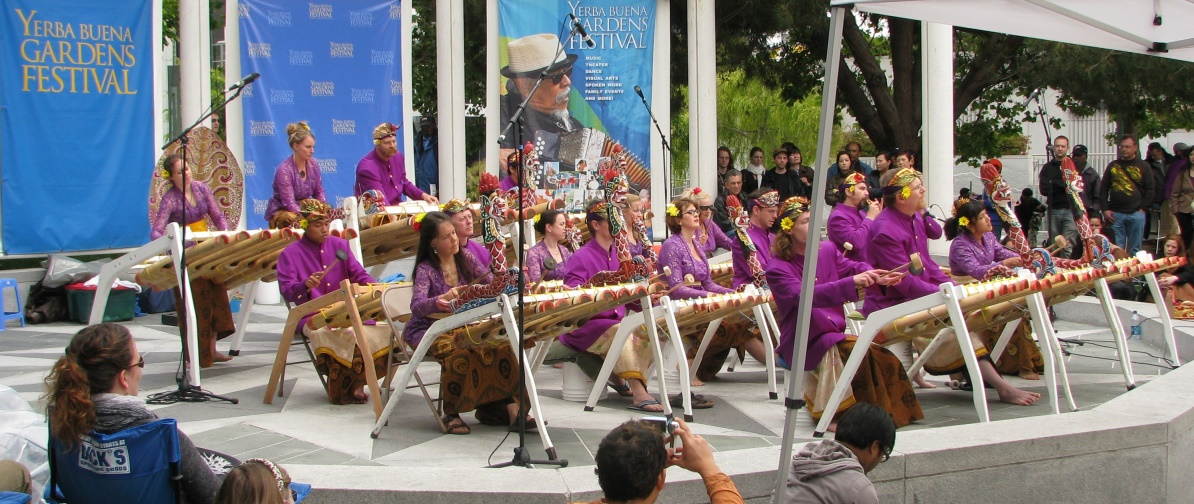
The jegog ensemble of Gamelan Sekar Jaya, performing in San Francisco in May 2008

Gamelan Sekar Jaya is a Balinese gamelan ensemble based in Berkeley, California, in the San Francisco Bay Area. It has been called "the finest Balinese gamelan ensemble outside of Indonesia" by Indonesia's Tempo Magazine. It performs the music and dance of Bali in many different genres of Balinese gamelan, mainly gamelan gong kebyar, gamelan angklung, gender wayang, and gamelan jegog. Past performances have also featured ensembles playing in other styles as well, including gamelan joged bumbung, gamelan semar pegulingan, kecak, gender batel, gamelan gambuh, genggong, and beleganjur. GSJ has also performed contemporary pieces featuring instruments from the Western tradition.

== History ==
Founded in 1979 by I Wayan Suweca, Rachel Ann Cooper and Michael Tenzer, Gamelan Sekar Jaya (GSJ) was the first community-based Balinese gamelan in the United States. Most of its performers are American volunteers, taught and led in performance by visiting Balinese master artists.

Popular both in the States and abroad, the group has performed all over North America and has toured Bali seven times (1985, 1992, 1995, 2000, 2003, 2010, and 2014). In 2000, Gamelan Sekar Jaya was awarded the Dharma Kusuma Award for Cultural Service by the Balinese government, the highest such honor given. The group regularly performs locally.

Gamelan is the Indonesian term for orchestra, and the name "Sekar Jaya" translates roughly to "Victorious Flower."

== Collaborations ==
Along with performing Balinese music and dance, the group has produced a number of cross-cultural collaborations. For example, GSJ commissioned the creation of a new score to the 1935 silent film, Legong: Dance of the Virgins, performing with the Club Foot Orchestra. A DVD of the film with this new score was released in 2004. Major GSJ collaborations include projects with Abhinaya, Crosspulse, Shadowlight, Destiny Arts, Chitresh Das. Sekar Jaya and some of its members have collaborated with the artist and musician collective The Residents at a few of their live shows such as "Wormwood" (1998) and "Icky Flix" (2001).

In 2011, GSJ and I Made Moja collaborated on a multimedia performance piece that fused music, dance, and other traditional art-forms of Bali, notably wayang kulit, Balinese shadow-puppetry.
