= Music of Bali =

Traditional Balinese music, Indonesia

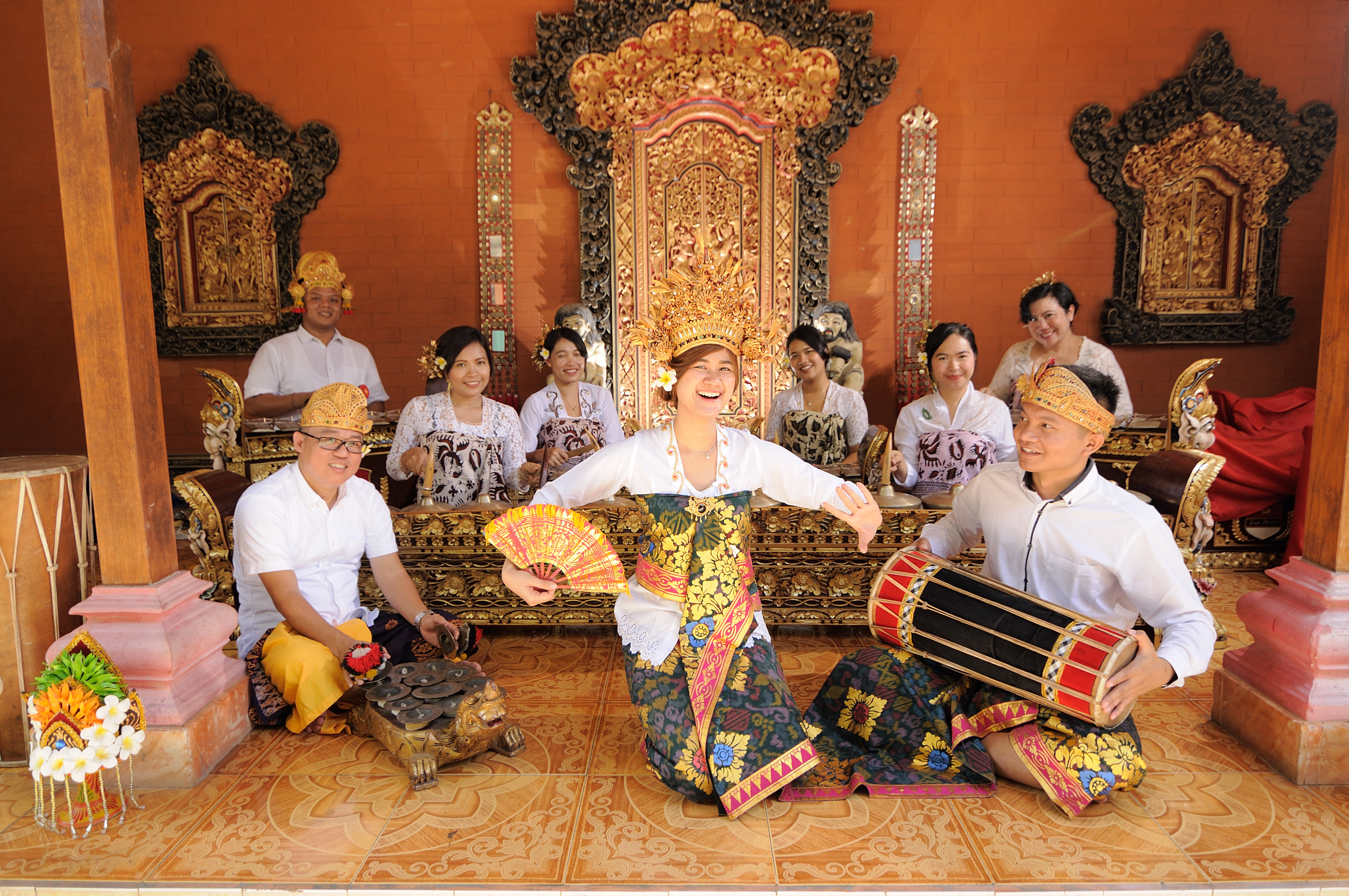
Balinese traditional musical instrument.

The Music of Bali, Bali is an Indonesian island that shares in the gamelan and other Indonesian musical styles. Bali, however, has its own techniques and styles, including kecak, a form of singing that imitates the sound of monkeys. In addition, the island is home to several unique kinds of gamelan, including the gamelan jegog, gamelan gong gede, gamelan gambang, gamelan selunding and gamelan semar pegulingan, the cremation music angklung and the processional music bebonangan. Modern popular styles include gamelan gong kebyar, dance music which developed during the Dutch occupation and 1950s era joged bumbung, another popular dance style. In Balinese music, metallophones, gongs and xylophones can also be heard.

== Characteristics ==
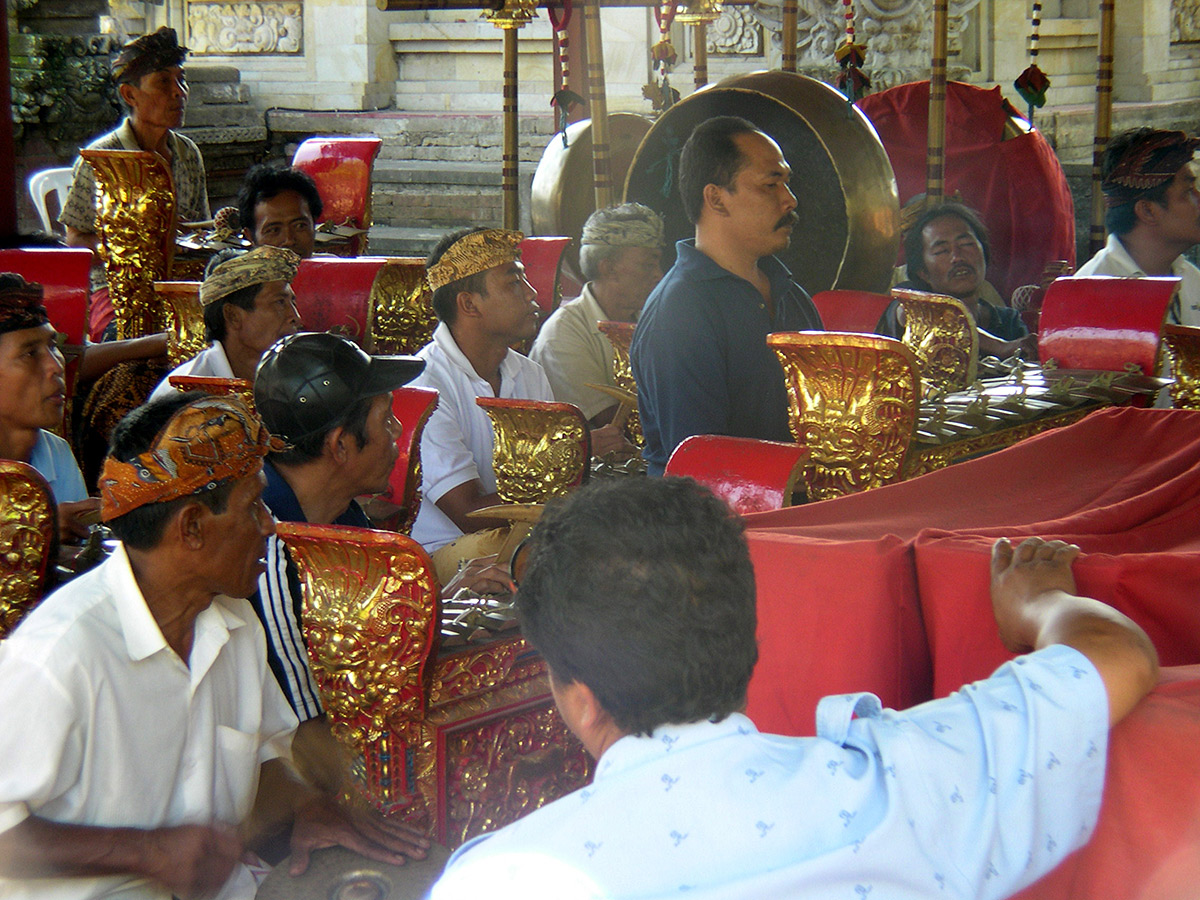
Balinese gamelan

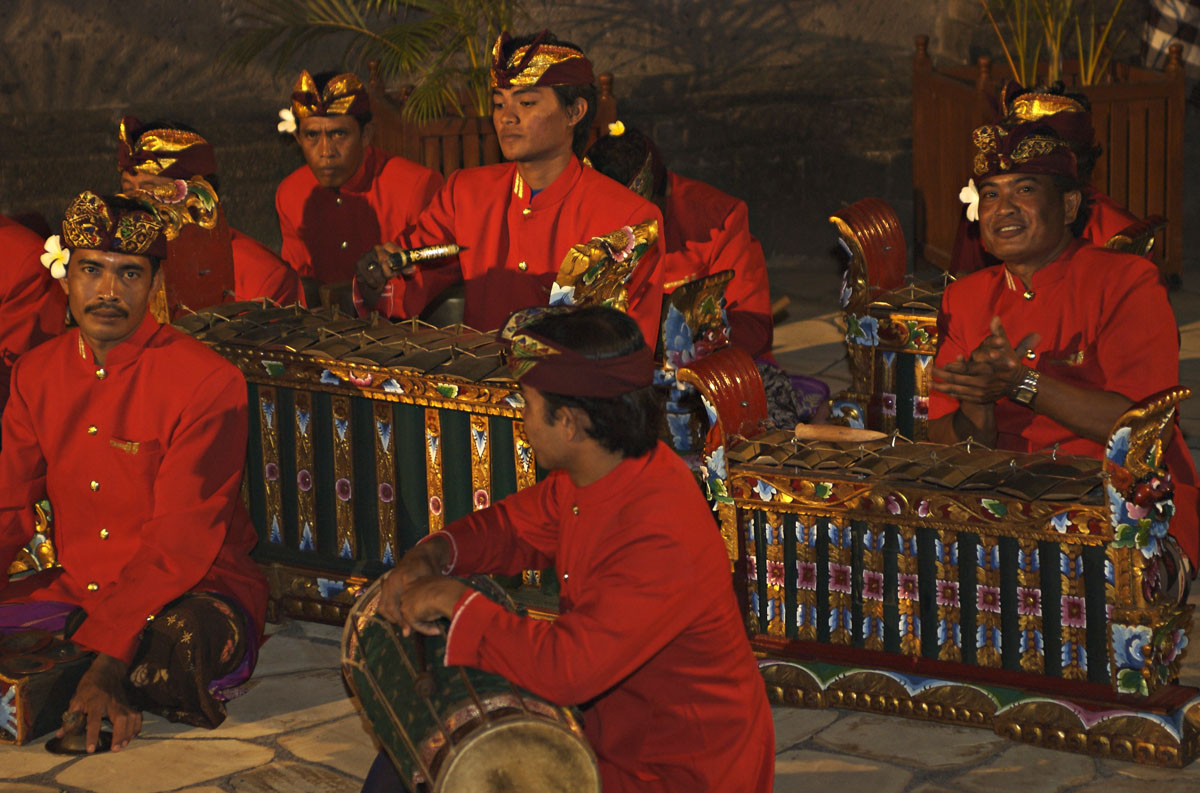
Balinese musicians.

Balinese music can be compared to Javanese music, especially that of the pre-Islamic period. During that time, Javanese tonal systems were imported to Bali.

Balinese gamelan, a form of Indonesian classical music, is louder, swifter and more aggressive than Sundanese and Javanese music. Balinese gamelan also features more archaic instrumentation than modern Sundanese and Javanese gamelans. Balinese instruments include bronze and bamboo xylophones. Gongs and a number of gong chimes, are used, such as the solo instrument trompong, and a variety of percussion instruments like cymbals, bells, drums and the anklung (a bamboo rattle). There are two sizes of bamboo flutes, both used in theatrical music, and a rebab (two-stringed spike fiddle).

Modern forms of Balinese gamelan include kebyar, an energetic style played by clubs, which generally compose their own music. An extensive study of gamelan gong kebyar is found in Gamelan Gong Kebyar: The Art of Twentieth-Century Balinese Music (2000) by Michael Tenzer, ISBN 0-226-79281-1 and ISBN 0-226-79283-8.

== See also ==
- Music of Indonesia
- Music of Java
- Music of Sumatra
