= Kebyar duduk =

Indonesian traditional dance

Kebyar Duduk
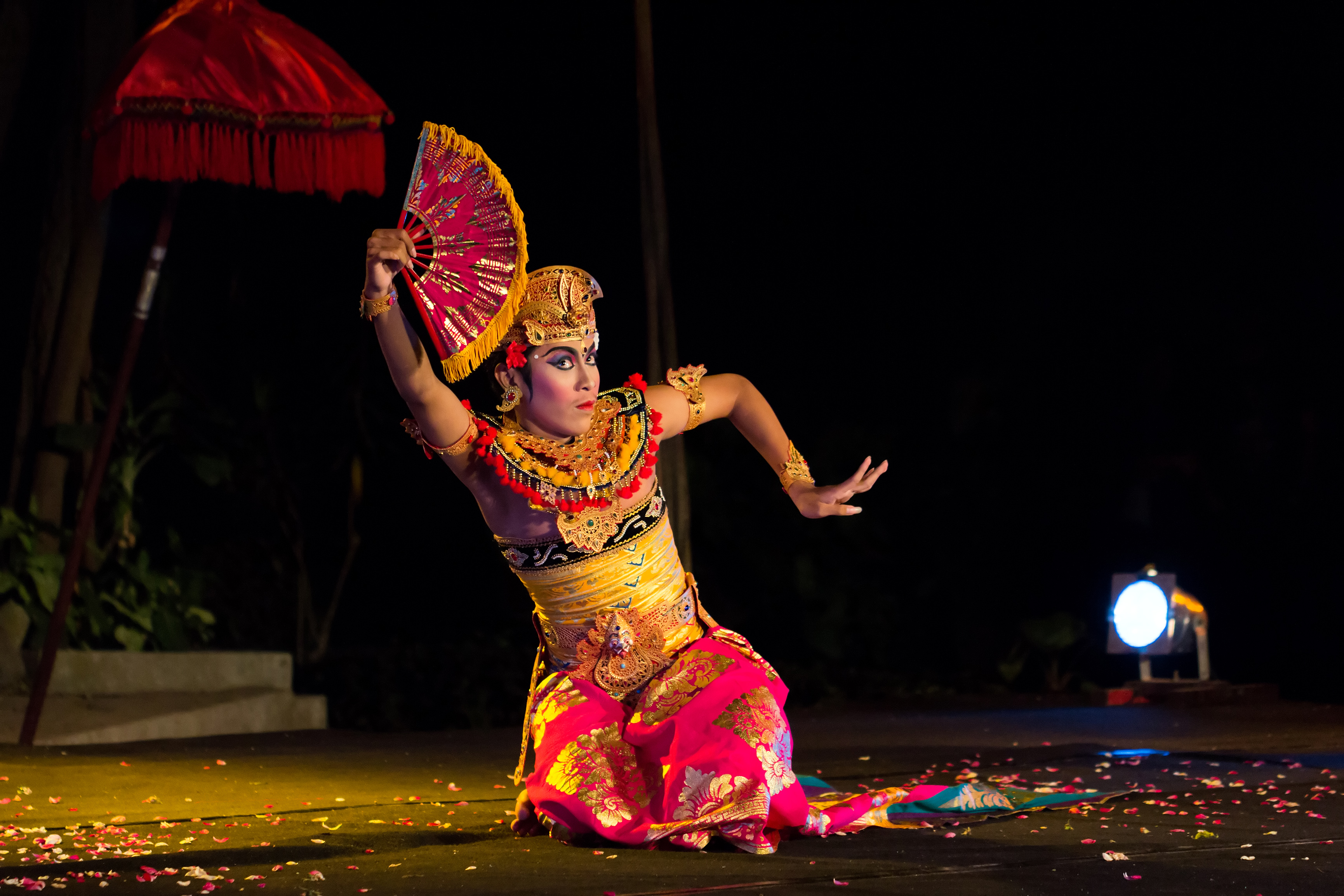
- A kebyar duduk dancer in a seated position (Performed by Nyoman T. Usadhi at Sanata Dharma University, 2014)
- Native name: ᬓᭂᬩ᭄ᬬᬃᬥᬸᬥᬸᬓ᭄ (Balinese); Tari Kebyar duduk (Indonesian)
- Instrument(s): Gong kebyar style of gamelan
- Inventor: Balinese
- Origin: Indonesia

Kebyar Duduk (Balinese: ᬓᭂᬩ᭄ᬬᬃᬥᬸᬥᬸᬓ᭄) is a traditional Balinese dance created by a Balinese man I Ketut Marya and first performed publicly in 1925. Inspired by the development of the quick-paced gamelan gong kebyar, kebyar duduk is named for the seated and half-seated positions taken by the dancers. It does not convey a story, but is interpretative.

== History ==
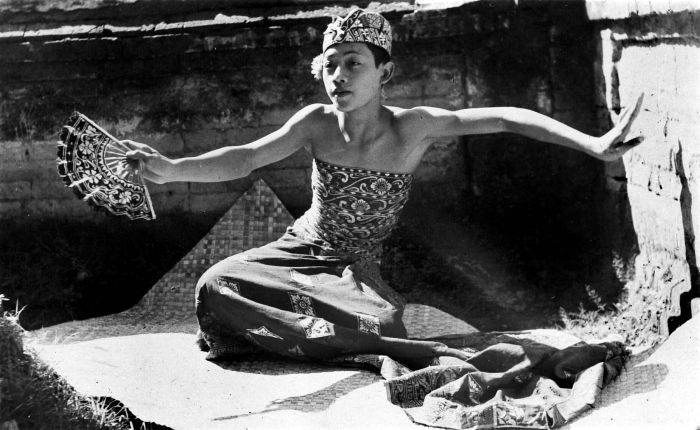
I Mario, performing kebyar duduk (c. 1925–1940)

The kebyar duduk dance was first performed in 1925 and designed by I Ketut Marya (better known in the West as I Mario) of Tabanan, Bali. In designing the kebyar duduk dance, I Mario was influenced by recent innovations in Balinese gamelan, which allowed interpretation of the music as well as a fast tempo. This development, known as the gamelan gong kebyar, was manifested early on in legong dances (specifically, kebyar legong), from which I Mario drew his inspiration. I Mario later developed the dance further, adding long instruments with inverted kettle gongs known as trompong; this form is known as kebyar trompong, though the original kebyar duduk remains I Mario's most famous creation.

I Mario taught his students how to dance kebyar duduk, and thus it proliferated throughout Bali. One such student, I Wayan Badra, performed for President Sukarno in the 1950s. By 2004 the dance was becoming rare, but its popularity increased, such that in 2011 a competition for dancing kebyar duduk and one of Mario's other creations, oleg tamulilingan (1952), was held. Around this time a group of Tabanan residents argued that the dance had shifted far from I Mario's original vision, and began teaching what they considered to be the "original" version.

Kebyar duduk was performed internationally as early as 1931, when a troupe which may have included I Mario or an early disciple performed it as part of a set (also including legong, barong, and baris) at the Paris Colonial Exposition. Video of I Mario performing kebyar duduk was included in the documentary Learning to Dance in Bali, which was completed by Gregory Bateson and Margaret Mead in the 1930s but first released in 1991.

"Kebyar" in Balinese means "flash, burst" and in music describes dynamic and sudden changes in volume and tempo. The name kebyar duduk is derived from the way in which the dance is performed: the dancers movements are almost all completed while in an almost seated position (duduk). Duduk actually is a Malay-Indonesian word; in Balinese it is "negak", but the dance never incorporates this word. It is classified as a "bebancihan" (androgynous) dance, as opposed to "halus" ("refined") dances of heroic male and female characters such as Rama and Sita, and the keras ("strong") forms such as the baris warrior dance.

== Performance ==
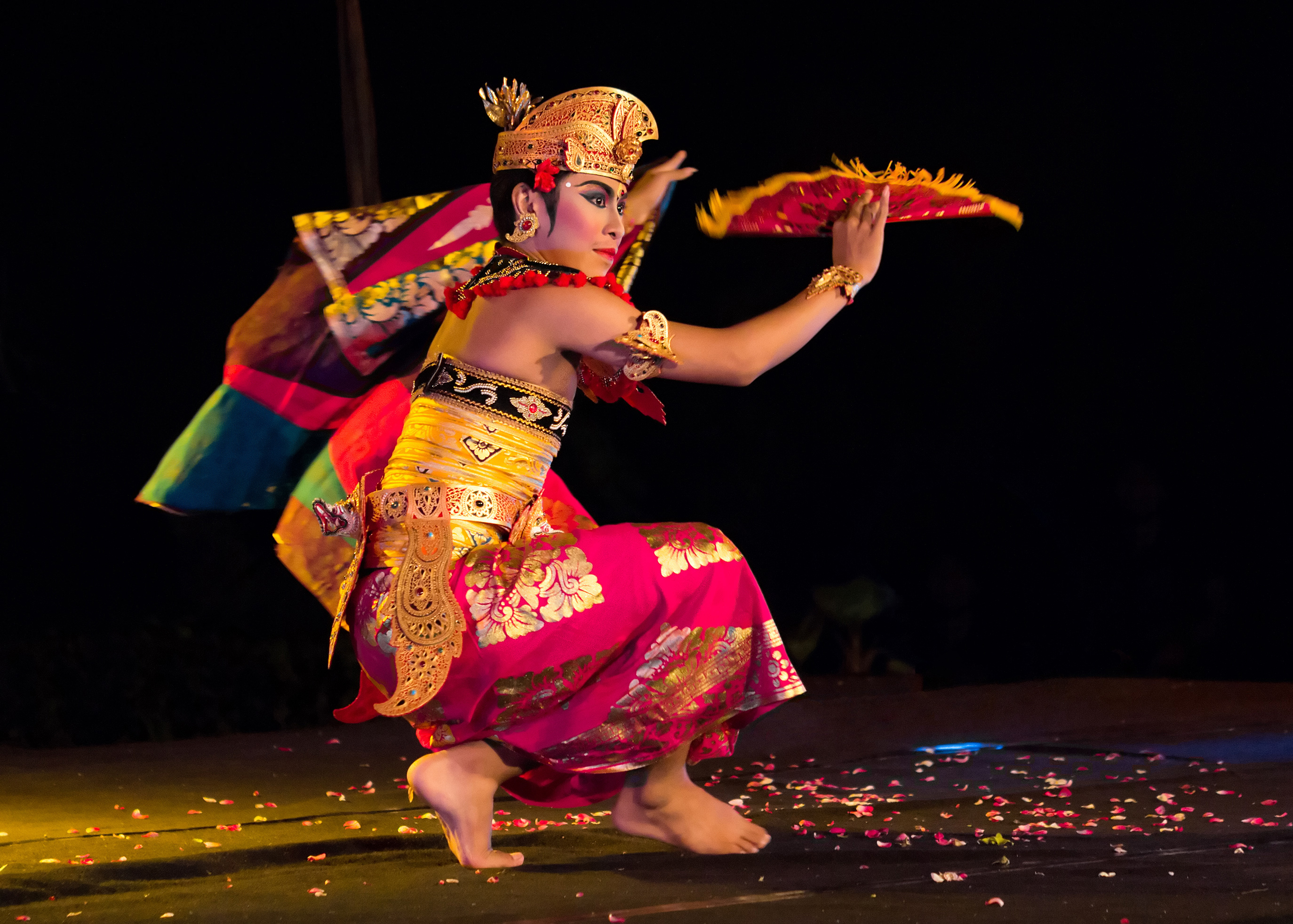
A dancer completing his spinning movements. (Performed by Nyoman T. Usadhi at Sanata Dharma University, 2014)

Generally, the kebyar duduk dance is performed by a single male dancer, though his make-up makes him appear almost androgynous. He wears a 5-metre (16 ft) long piece of fabric (kamben), which is decorated with a gold-painted pattern known as a prada. His accessories and headgear (the latter known as an udeng) are golden and shimmering; because of this, and the traditional designs in these accessories, the writer Kartika Suardana characterizes them as giving an "extra exotic traditional effect". In his right hand, the dancer holds a fan.

During the performance, the dancer is mostly seated or half-seated, at times taking a cross-legged squatting position. At times, fan in hand, the dancer will spin around in circles without standing. His eyes are very active, conveying a wide range of emotions, which can range from coquettish to bashful to angry over the course of routine. This dance is, however, purely interpretative, and not intended to convey a story.

The music is played with fast, complex rhythms and striking sounds. The musicologist Michael Tenzer characterizes the relationship between the drummer in the gamelan troupe and the dancer as almost a type of contest. The drummer, while beating out a tempo of four beats per second, must also respond quickly to the dancer's cues by signalling the other members of the gamelan troupe. The dancer, meanwhile, must send his cues (flourishes known as angsel) in a fixed relation to the metre of the music. Towards the end of a performance, however, the drummer and dancer may engage in a sort of duet, seeming to struggle for control of the music.

== See also ==
- Balinese dance
- Dance in Indonesia

== Works cited ==
- Arini, Kusuma (15 February 2004). "I Wayan Badra dan Pesona 'Kebyar Duduk'" [I Wayan Badra and the Spellbinding 'Kebyar Duduk']. Bali Post (in Indonesian). Archived from the original on 23 September 2015.
- Descutner, Janet (2004). Asian Dance. Philadelphia: Chelsea House. ISBN 978-0-7910-7642-2.
- Juniartha, I Wayan (11 August 2011). "An oft-filmed island". The Jakarta Post. Archived from the original on 29 November 2014.
- Kusmayati, A.M. Hermin (1992). "Tari Daerah" [Regional Dance]. In Soedarsono (ed.). Pengantar Apresiasi Seni [Introduction to Art Appreciation] (in Indonesian). Jakarta: Balai Pustaka. OCLC 29591251.
- McIntosh, Jonathan (2012). "Preparation, Presentation and Power: Children's Performances in a Balinese Dance Studio". In Hélène Neveu Kringelbach; Jonathan Skinner (eds.). Dancing Cultures: Globalization, Tourism and Identity in the Anthropology of Dance. Dance and performance studies. Vol. 4. New York: Berghahn Books. pp. 194–210. ISBN 978-0-85745-575-8.
- Suardana, Kartika D (2012). Dances of Bali. Kuta: Now! Bali. ISBN 978-602-97971-1-4.
- Suartaya, Kadek (4 September 2011). "Tabanan Mengusung Mario sang Maestro Nan Virtuoso" [Tabanan Promotes Mario, the Virtuoso Maestro]. Bali Post (in Indonesian). Archived from the original on 29 November 2014.
- Tenzer, Michael (2000). Gamelan Gong Kebyar: The Art of Twentieth-century Balinese Music. Chicago studies in ethnomusicology. Chicago: University of Chicago Press. ISBN 978-0-226-79281-1.
- Winet, Evan (1998). "Great Reckonings in a Simulated City: Artaud's Misunderstanding of Balinese Theatre". In Stanley Vincent Longman (ed.). Crosscurrents in the Drama: East and West. Tuscaloosa: University of Alabama Press. pp. 108–15. ISBN 978-0-8173-0926-8.
