= Gamelan gambang =

Indonesian traditional musical instruments

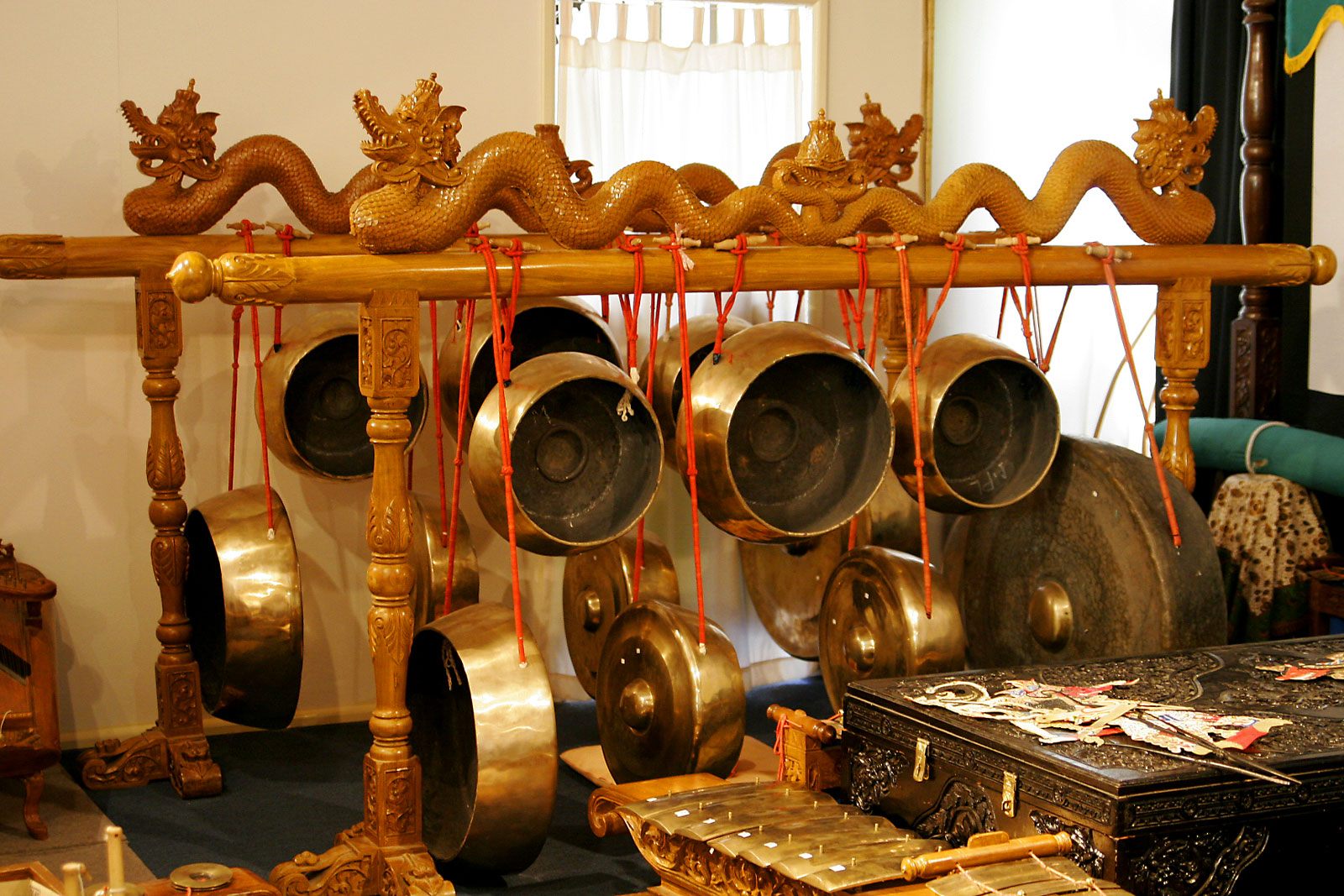
Traditional Indonesian instruments

The gamelan gambang is a type of gamelan ensemble in Bali which uses four gambangs, a wooden xylophone-like instrument (as opposed to most gamelan instruments, which are made of bronze), as well as two sarons. It is considered an ancient and sacred ensemble, and is used for temple and funeral rites. It uses seven tones.

== See also ==
- Gamelan
- Beleganjur
- Jegog
- Selunding
