= Gangsa =

Indonesian musical instrument used in Gamelan

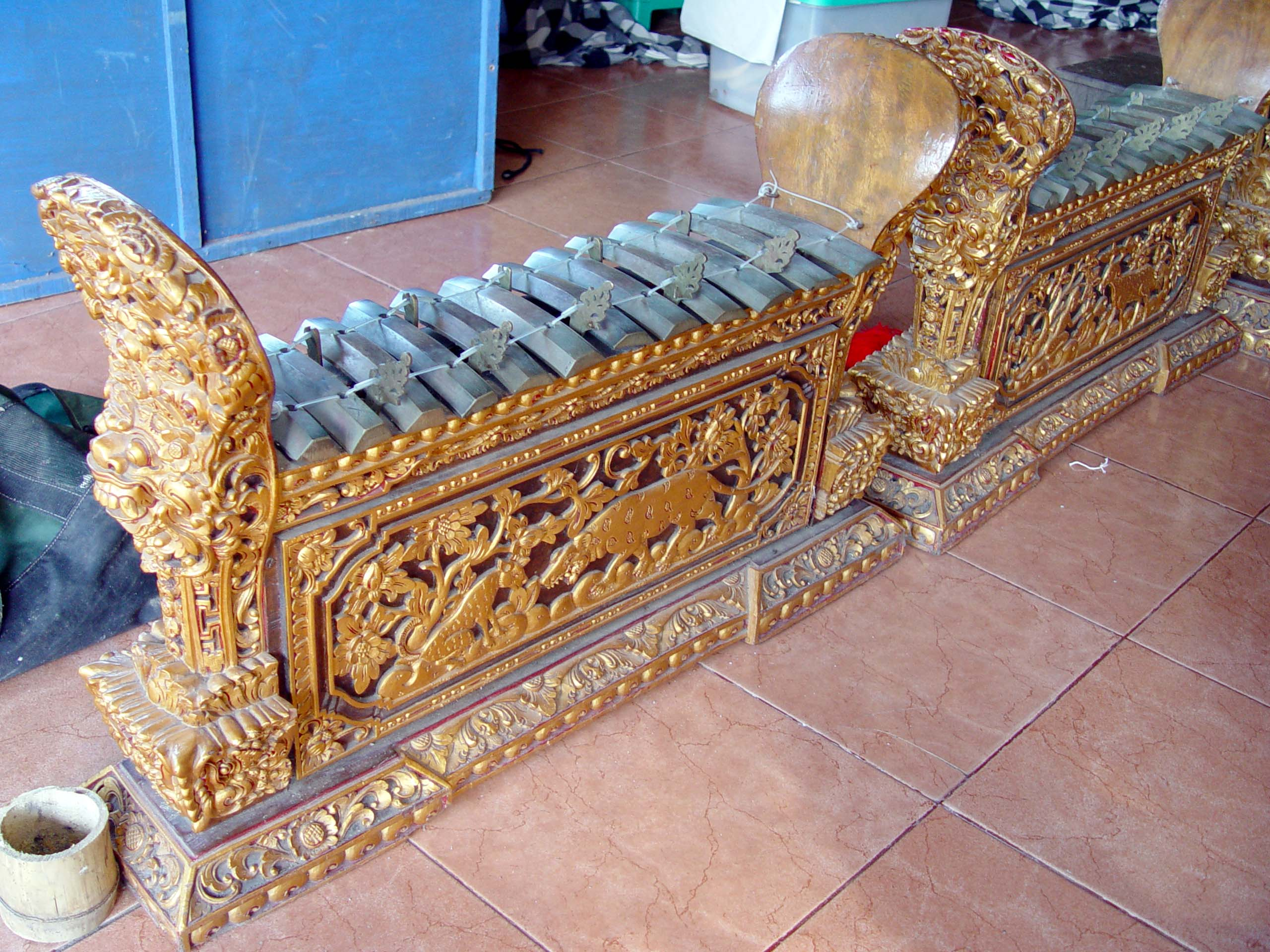
- Classification: Percussion instrument; Idiophone; Metallophone
- Developed: Indonesia

A gangsa is a type of metallophone which is used mainly in Balinese and Javanese Gamelan music in Indonesia. In Balinese gong kebyar styles, there are two types of gangsa typically used: the smaller, higher pitched kantilan and the larger pemade. Each instrument consists of several tuned metal bars (either iron or bronze) each placed over an individual resonator. The bars are hit with a wooden panggul, each producing a different pitch. Duration of sound intensity and sound quality factors are generally accomplished by damping the vibration of the bar with the fingers of the free hand. Balinese gong kebyar gangsas, as with other metallophones in gong kebyar ensembles, are played in neighboring pairs with interlocking, rapid-tempo parts that elaborate on the melody of a piece of music (see Kotekan); these pairs are tuned to be dissonant and create certain wavelengths of sympathetic vibrations to create a shimmering tone (see Ombak) that travels long distances. The gangsa is very similar to the old gendér and the saron.

The same word is used to identify an ensemble of shallow hand-held gongs (one per musician) and to refer to the individual gongs as well in the traditional music of the Cordilleran Igorot peoples of Northern Luzon. Most performances are used to accompany dance. There is no standard tuning, and there are several methods of holding and addressing these gongs.

== Contextual Associations ==
The gangsa is a metallophone idiophone of the Balinese people of Bali, Indonesia. It is a melodic instrument that is part of a Balinese gamelan gong kebyar. Traditionally, a single gamelan craftsman's workshop would construct, upon commission, a unified and uniquely tuned set of bronze instruments, numbering twenty or more, the sum total of which would constitute a gamelan gong kebyar. Sometime in the latter half of the 20th century, Balinese gamelan craftsmen realized there was a market, consisting mostly of foreign gamelan enthusiasts, interested in procuring single instruments. The gangsa pictured here is a product of this market niche. In a complete Balinese gamelan gong kebyar there would be, typically, nine gangsa of three different sizes and pitch registers called, from the largest and lowest-pitched to the smallest and highest-pitched: ugal, pemade, and kantilan. Each of these varieties of gangsa has ten keys suspended over tuned-bamboo resonators and are tuned to a pentatonic scale over the range of two octaves. The gangsa pictured here would, in the context of a full gamelan gong kebyar, be called a pemade. The wood casings of all gamelan gong kebyar instruments are typically ornately carved and often painted in vibrant shades of red and gold. Although not painted, the gangsa pictured here displays robust and deep carving on its surfaces consisting of stylized vegetation motifs (see detail #1) also found throughout the island of Bali on Hindu temples and other traditional architecture. Dating back to only the 1910s, the gamelan gong kebyar tradition has become the most iconic of Bali's many types of sacred and secular gamelan traditions. Sets are found in many villages and neighborhoods of towns and cities, occupied by musicians from all walks of life. They are performed for religious celebrations, at arts schools and conservatories, for competitions, and at tourist venues, playing both instrumental compositions and for the accompaniment of dances.

== Description ==
The gangsa is a two-octave metallophone with ten rectangular-shaped keys (don) suspended by rope and posts over tuned tube resonators (tiying or bumbung). The keys of this gangsa are made from bronze (krawang). Graduated in size, the keys are arranged in a horizontal plane from the longest, widest and thinnest one at one end of the case to the shortest, narrowest, and thickest one at the other end (see detail #2 and detail #3). Holes to receive the cord by which a key is suspended are drilled at one-quarter of a key's total length from both its ends. These are nodal (dead) points in the mode of vibration for rectangular keys. The keys are suspended over a teakwood casing (plawah) and above cylindrical tube resonators (bumbung) made from bamboo (tiying), one for each of the instrument's ten keys. Vertical wooden spacers are placed between the bumbung to keep them in alignment with their respective keys. Although externally the resonators are all the same length, internally they are stopped by a natural node that articulates a cavity of air which will maximally resonate the frequency of the key suspended above it (the differing positions of these nodes can be seen in detail #4). A row of metal posts is located on each of the two upward-facing flat surfaces of the case between pairs of keys, and upon these rest leather cords the ends of which are securely tied to the shoulders of the case. Each cord runs through and back out the hole at one end of each key. The loop thus formed on the bottom-side of a key has a short bamboo stop-pin inserted in it so that when the cord is pulled taut it blocks the cord from exiting the hole (see detail #5). This system of suspension involves minimal contact between non-sonorous material and the key itself, allowing it to vibrate freely for a long period of time after being struck. One wooden hammer-shaped beater (panggul) is used to strike the bars (detail #6).

== See also ==
Pelog selisir
The pelog selisir scale, played on a gangsa.

- Gamelan
- Music of Bali
- Reyong
- Music of the Philippines#Gong music
