= Ugal =

Indonesian instrument

The ugal is an instrument in the Indonesian gamelan orchestra. It is a bronze metallophone played one handed with a small hammer, often in a dance-like manner. There are usually ten keys, giving a maximum range spanning about two octaves. Like the gangsa and gendèr, they are suspended over tuned bamboo resonators.

The ugal features mainly in gamelan gong kebyar, where it carries the central melody (pokok) of the piece. Sometimes it may give its melodic duty to the jublag, where it then takes over as the leader of a kotekan.

There is often only one ugal in the kebyar ensemble, and it is usually deeper toned. It is played by one of the leaders of the ensemble. A second, higher toned ugal is sometimes used. The ugal is taller than the other gangsa, and the player sits on a short stool, so as to allow the player to cue the ensemble visually with ease.

The instrument also has 10 keys, with a range of two octaves, and is played with a hard wooden mallet, slightly larger than the other gangsa panguls and usually with additional ornamentations so the leader's sometimes theatrical cues actively catch the light. Its notes are an octave lower than those of the gangsa pemadé. The ugals play a combination of gangsa parts and cues, melodic solos, and the underlying melody with flourishes. The first, front ugal cues and plays elements of the polos interlocking gangsa part (the part that plays more often on the beat), and if there is a second ugal, it plays elements of the sangish part (gangsa notes more often off the beat).
