= Gamelan semar pegulingan =

Indonesian traditional musical instruments

Gamelan semar pegulingan is an old variety of the Balinese gamelan. Dating back from around the 17th century, the style is sweeter and more reserved than the more popular and progressive Gamelan Gong Kebyar. Semar pegulingan is derived from the ancient flute ensemble gamelan gambuh which utilizes a 7 tone scale. Semar pegulingan also uses the 7 tone scale which enables several pathet (similar to modes or scales) to be played. Semar is the name of the Hindu God of love and pegulingan means roughly 'laying down'. It was originally played near the sleeping chambers of the palace to lull the king and his concubines to sleep. The ensemble includes suling, various small percussion instruments similar to sleigh bells and finger cymbals, and trompong - a row of small kettle gongs that play the melody. A similar type of ensemble, Gamelan Pelegongan, substitutes a pair of gendérs for the trompong as the melody carrier and plays the music for a set of dances known as legong.

In medieval Bali (circa 1700–1906), gamelan semar pegulingan was an important part of the Balinese courts. Accompanying court rituals and pendet dances at temple ceremonies, Semar pegulingan also served to lull the royal family to sleep when it played in the late evenings in the inner sanctum of the palace. There are very few of these gamelan left in Bali. This orchestra is used primarily for instrumental pieces, as the dance repertoire is long since forgotten. The orchestra includes saron jongkok, a gentorag bell-tree, gumanak tube chimes and a kempyung–all features of court gamelan.

== See also ==
- Gamelan
- Gong kebyar
- Jegog
- Gender wayang

== Discography ==
- (1972/January 28, 2003). Indonesia: Bali: Gamelan Semar Pegulingan: Gamelan of the Love God. Nonesuch Explorer Series. Recorded in Teges Kanyinan, Pliatan, Bali by Robert E. Brown.
- (2009). Bali: Semara Pagulingan: Antique Balinese Court Gamelan. Mekar Bhuana. Recorded in Sanur, Bali by Vaughan Hatch (Antida Studio).
