= Gamelan gender wayang =

Indonesian traditional musical instruments

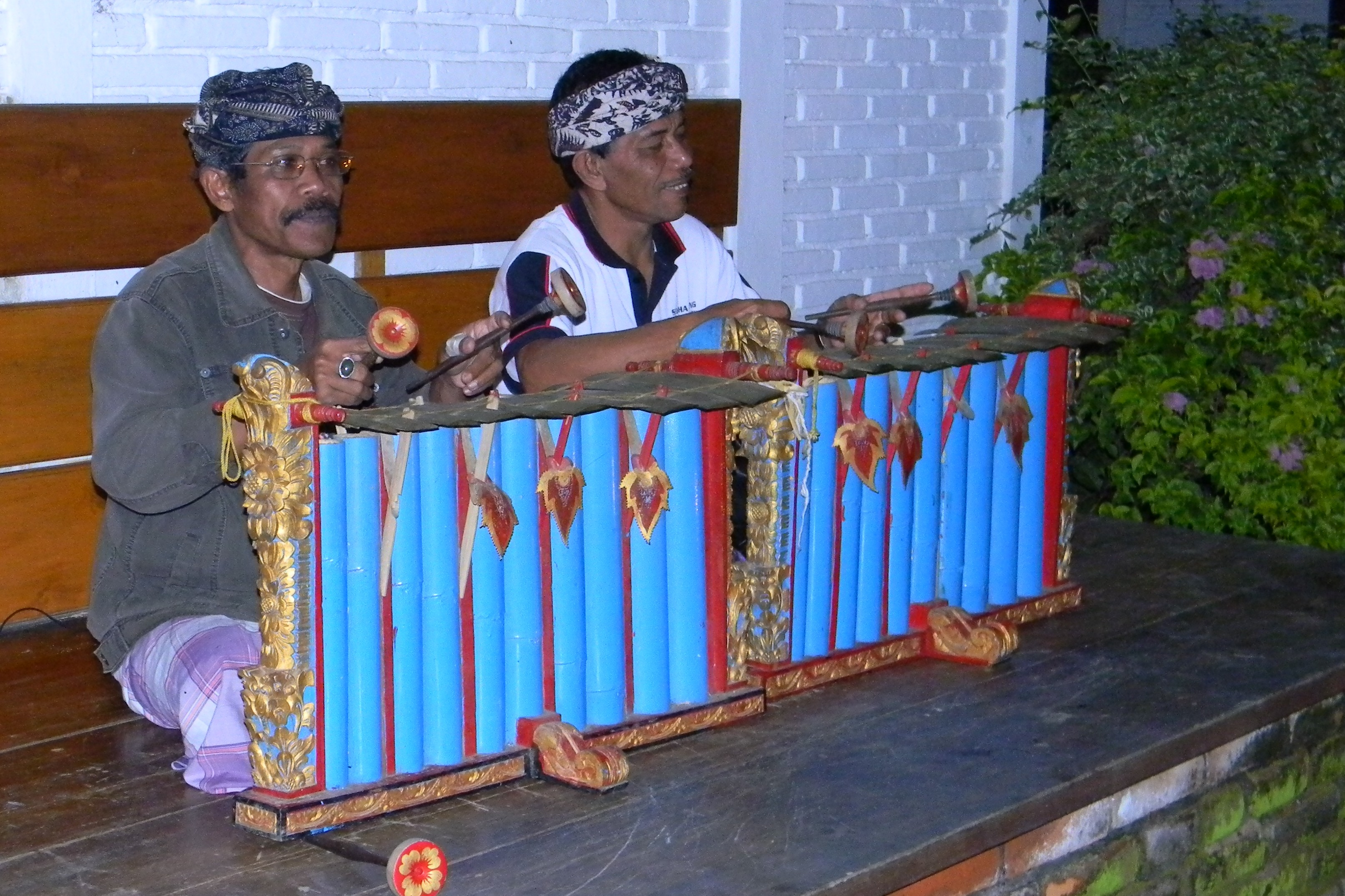
- Gamelan gender wayang ensemble
- Developed: Indonesia

Gamelan gender wayang is a style of gamelan music played in Bali, Indonesia. It is required for wayang (shadow puppet theatre) and most sacred Balinese Hindu rituals. The smallest of gamelan ensembles, it requires only two players and is complete at four, the additional instruments doubling an octave above. Like other gamelan genres, it incorporates delicate interlocking melodies and active contrapuntal movement, yet poses unique challenges in technique and composition.

== Religious and cultural context ==
I Wayan Loceng reports that "Gender wayang, one of the most ancient musical ensembles existing in Bali, accompanies shadow theatre as well as tooth filings, cremations, and other religious ceremonies." He describes repertoire from Sukawati, noting that the area is famous for shadow play and the development and maintenance of the gender wayang tradition.

The ensemble is ubiquitous in Bali, however, due to its ritual importance, and distinct regional styles feature divergent repertoire.

== Instruments ==
The two basic gender wayang instruments are each constructed from a wood frame and ten rectangular, bronze keys suspended by string and composite hide and wood bridges over upright, tuned bamboo resonators. A complete set has two pairs of gender, the additional pair doubling an octave higher. An instrument spans two octaves with a pentatonic (five-tone) scale. Each pair consists of a male and female instrument, the female being slightly larger and slightly lower in pitch. Mallets are slender and radially symmetrical with wooden disc heads and conical bead-like horn rattles. Their shape allows players to fit mallets between the second and third fingers of loosely open hands and strike and dampen keys simultaneously with minute, rotating motions of the forearms. Because of this technique, the relative exposure of two instrumental parts, and the execution of syncopated, dynamic compositions in precise synchronicity, gamelan gender wayang is considered one of the most complex genres of Balinese music.

== Tuning ==
Gamelan gender Wayang
Gamelan gender Wayang ensemble accompanying Balinese Wayang puppetry

Like other Balinese gamelan, gender wayang are only approximately standardized in relative pitch, though instruments of each group are precisely tuned with masterful pitch pairing and register stretching. Absolute pitch varies according to the bronzesmith's preference. As a result, individual instruments are rarely exchangeable with those from any group other than its original. One instrument in the each pitch register, pengisup (sucker), are tuned a hair higher than their mates, pengumbang (waver); due to our logarithmically scaled sense of hearing, the lowest notes need to be paired further apart in absolute pitches than the highest to achieve the same, ideal rate of “shimmer” at unison. Further, octave intervals are stretched to be slightly more than double the hertz to achieve a similar “shimmer” at octaves.

Gender wayang are in slendro pentatonic tuning, approximately C D E G A on the Western scale.

== See also ==
- Gamelan
- Jegog
- Gong kebyar
- Gong gede
