= Kotekan =

Indonesian musical melody used in Gamelan

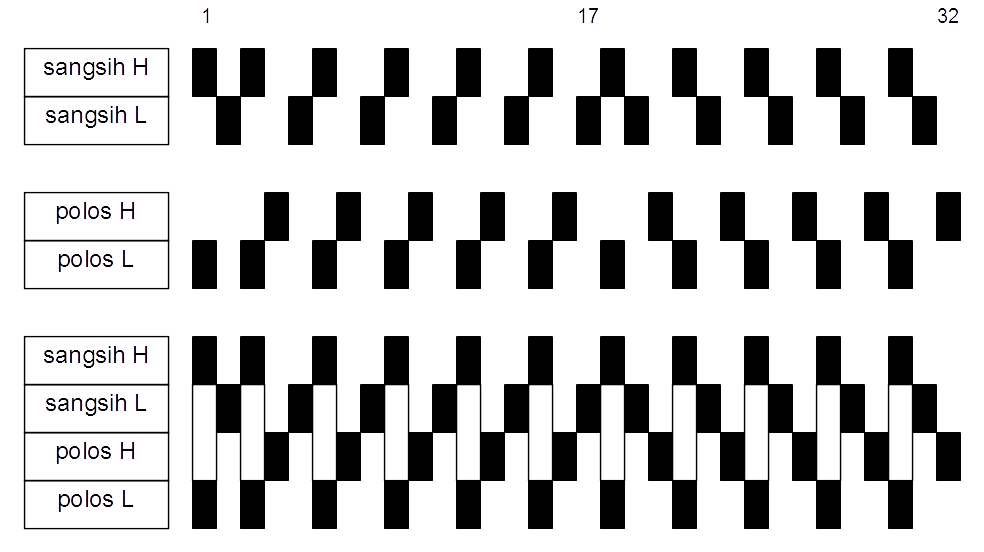
An example of kotekan empat (H=high, L=low) depicting the sangsih part (top), the polos part (middle), and their composite (bottom)

Kotekan is a style of playing fast interlocking parts in most varieties of Balinese Gamelan music, including Gamelan gong kebyar, Gamelan angklung, Gamelan jegog and others.

Kotekan are "sophisticated interlocking parts," "characteristic of gong kebyar and several other Balinese gamelan styles, that combine to create the illusion of a single melodic line that often sounds faster than any single human could possibly play." According to Colin McPhee: "Composed of two rhythmically opposing parts which...interlock to create a perpetual flow of sound, the kotekan adds sheen and intensity to the music, ...calls for the utmost rhythmic precision...[and] lies in the top register of the gamelan."

One of the most striking features of Balinese gamelan music...is kotekan, the rapid interlocking figuration that permeates nearly all kebyar compositions. It creates a unique sonic impression: a group of gangsa (bronze metallophones) struck with hard wooden mallets produce an intricately patterned lay of sound above the more sustained tones of the lower instruments; the reyong, a row of small tuned gongs played by four musicians, creates a different (but equally complex) figuration of a softer attack and sound color; and leading them all are a pair of drummers who play yet another kind of interlocking patterns.

— Wayne Vitale

In kotekan there are two independent parts called polos and sangsih, each of which fills in the gaps of the other to form a complete rhythmic texture. In Gamelan gong kebyar, Kotekan is usually played on the higher-pitched gangsa and reyong as embellishment to the main melody (pokok) played on the calung and ugal.

The busy upper registers of the gamelan are the domain of the gangsas and reyong. These instruments spin out kotekan, the crackling ornamental fireworks of Balinese music. Kotekan is usually expressed in English as 'interlocking parts', because although it sounds as one melody it is actually composed of two interdependent musical lines that are incomplete when played alone and dependent exclusively on each other for obtaining the desired result. That can range from stately murmuring some of the older, simpler styles of kotekan, to extroverted, jazzy acrobatics in modern music. The tight interaction of the two parts produces a supple texture that is pointillistic in detail and fluid as a whole. ... Much of the excitement of Balinese music arises from these irresistible rhythms.

— Michael Tenzer

Note: In the transliteration of Balinese used here, the letter "c" represents a sound similar to English "ch".

== Nyog cag ==
Nyog cag. Stems-up is polos, stems-down is sangsih. All pitches are only approximate.

Nyog cag is a straightforward alternation between polos and sangsih, each playing only every other note of a scale or other melodic figuration. Though structurally the simplest form of kotekan, nyog cag can be difficult to play accurately, especially because it is used at the fastest tempos.

== Nyok cok ==
Nyok cok is an ornamentation of the pokok melody in which polos and sangsih anticipate the next pitch of the pokok in unison and then each plays one of its neighbor tones.

== Kotekan telu ==
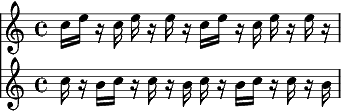
Kotekan telu. Lower staff is polos, upper staff is sangsih.

In kotekan telu, the polos and sangsih share a set of three pitches (telu means three in Balinese). One of the parts plays the low and middle pitches, the other plays the middle and high pitches. The middle pitch is always played in unison by both parts except if kotekan telu is played by the reyong, because the two or four players share the same set of pots.

== Kotekan empat ==
Kotekan empat. Stems-down is polos, stems-up is sangsih.

Kotekan empat is similar to kotekan telu, except in this case there are four pitches (empat means "four" in Indonesian). One part plays the lower two and the other plays the upper two; there is no sharing of pitches. Usually the lowest and highest pitches are struck simultaneously, and the interval they form varies depending upon where the notes fall in the scale and the tuning of the ensemble.

== Kotekan theory ==
This tendency towards saturation of the finest units of detail is found in other traditional Balinese art forms as well, such as painting and sculpture. In all these forms, the artistic space is rarely left blank or only in plain outline, but rather is filled with highly ornate detail to the outer boundary limits of the piece. This is expressed in Indonesian by the word ramai (crowded or busy), which to the Balinese is a highly desirable condition in almost any realm.

— Wayne Vitale

Kotekan are typically composed by elaborating the pokok melody. The subdivisions of the composite kotekan are usually played four or eight times faster than the pokok. Since the kotekan patterns are either three notes (telu) or three sounds (the kotekan empat has two solo pitches plus the open interval), the simple patterns do not repeat every four or eight notes. This can be illustrated in the following example:

Kotekan 1 2 3 1 2 3 1 2 3 1 2 3 1 2 3 1 etc...
Pokok   1 . . . 2 . . . 3 . . . 1 . . . etc...

The above is the most basic example of a kotekan telu. In the example the numbers refer to the different pitches being played. The kotekan is repeating the same pattern over and over. Note that the pokok is exactly the same pattern played four times slower. The kotekan would be divided into polos and sangsih as follows:

Polos   1 2 . 1 2 . 1 2 . 1 2 . 1 2 . 1 etc...
Sangsih . 2 3 . 2 3 . 2 3 . 2 3 . 2 3 . etc...
Pokok   1 . . . 2 . . . 3 . . . 1 . . . etc...

If the pokok changes, the kotekan will follow it. Here is a simple example that is similar to the first example except that it changes direction.

Kotekan 1 2 3 1 2 3 1 2 3 2 1 3 2 1 3 2 etc...
Pokok   1 . . . 2 . . . 3 . . . 2 . . . etc...

Notice that this example can repeat over and over. Here is what the separate parts might look like:

Polos   1 2 . 1 2 . 1 2 . 2 1 . 2 1 . 2 etc...
Sangsih . 2 3 . 2 3 . 2 3 2 . 3 2 . 3 2 etc...
Pokok   1 . . . 2 . . . 3 . . . 2 . . . etc...

Here is the same melody with kotekan empat:

Polos   1 2 . 1 2 . 1 2 . 2 1 . 2 1 . 2 etc...
Sangsih 4 . 3 4 . 3 4 . 3   4 3 . 4 3 . etc...
Pokok   1 . . . 2 . . . 3 . . . 2 . . . etc...

The polos part is the same as the previous example. However, the sangsih part is very different.

== See also ==
- Gamelan
- Hocket
- Imbal
- Panerusan
- Gatra
- Colotomy
- Gendhing structures
- Music of Indonesia
- Music of Java
