= Reyong =

Indonesian musical instrument used in Balinese gamelan

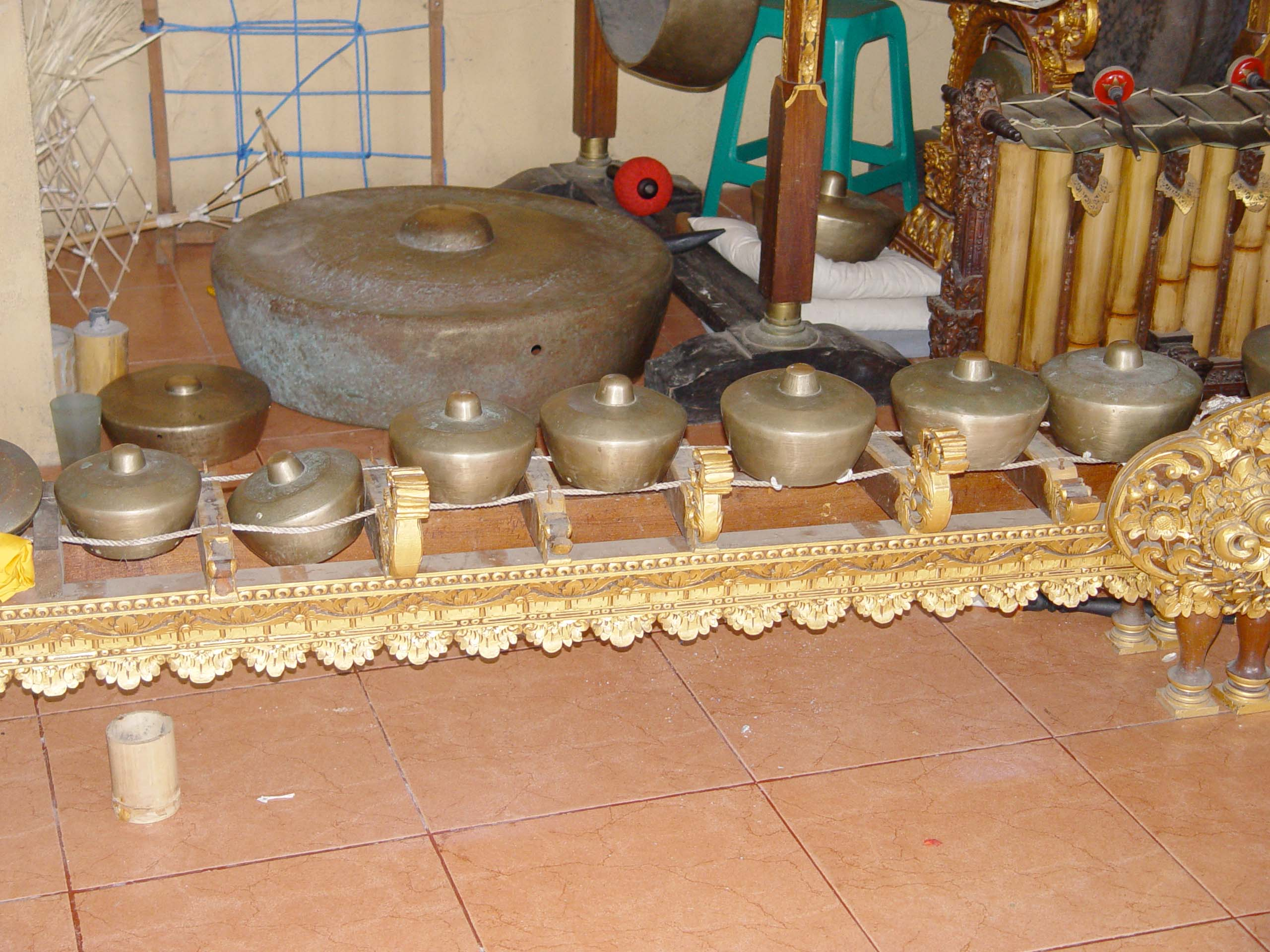
- Classification: Percussion instrument; Idiophone; Gong
- Developed: Indonesia

The reyong (also spelled reong) is a musical instrument used in Balinese gamelan. It consists of a long row of metal gongs suspended on a frame. In gamelan gong kebyar, it is played by four players at once, each with two mallets.

Often the individual pots can be removed from the frame and played individually as bonang in beleganjur.

== See also ==
- Gamelan
- Music of Bali
