= Calung =

Indonesian traditional musical instrument

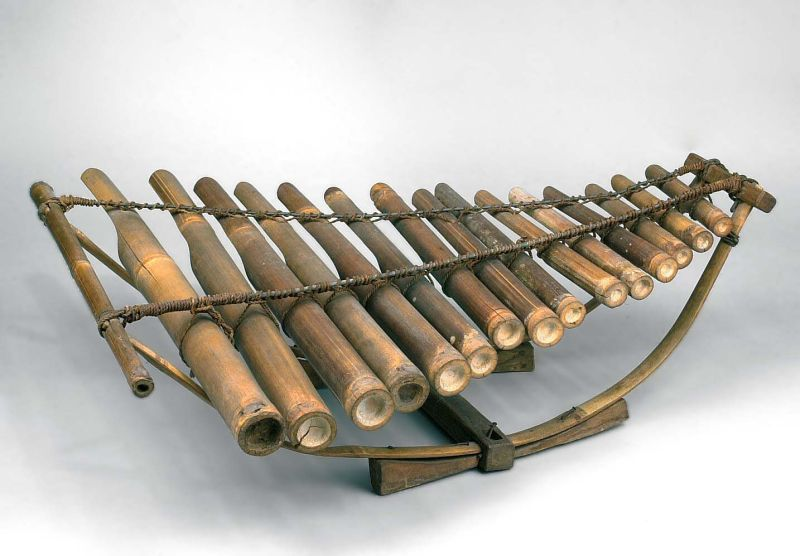
- A calung musical instrument from Indonesia.

Percussion instrument
- Classification: Idiophone
- Hornbostel–Sachs classification: 111.232 (Sets of percussion tubes)
- Inventor: Baduy people
- Developed: Java (in Banten by both Baduy and Bantenese, in West Java by Sundanese, in Banyumas by Banyumasan) and Bali (by Balinese)

Indonesian Angklung
- UNESCO Intangible Cultural Heritage
- Country: Indonesia
- Reference: 00393
- Region: Asia and the Pacific

Inscription history
- Inscription: 2010 (5th session)
- List: Representative
- Traditional Angklung (Pentatonic – Slendro Scale: Angklung Kanekes, Angklung Dogdog Lojor, Angklung Gabrag, Angklung Badeng, Angklung Bungko, Angklung Badud, Angklung Buncis, and angklung Calung) and Modern Angklung (Diatonic/Chromatic - Slendro, Pelog, and Madenda Scale: Angklung Padaeng)

The Calung (Sundanese: ᮎᮜᮥᮀ) is a type of Indonesian bamboo xylophone originating from Baduy culture and commonly used in Baduy, Bantenese, Sundanese, Banyumasan, and Balinese performances. The calung (instrument) consists of multiple bamboo tubes which are struck at the base to produce a woody sound.

In the Balinese Gamelan gong kebyar, the metallophone jublag can also be known as Calung, it has a one-octave range, and is generally utilized to play mid-range melodies.

In Banyumas, southwestern Central Java in Indonesia, when Calung is referred to as an ensemble, it uses multiple bamboo instruments and is composed of singers and dancers. The ensemble is characterized by a variety of traits that include: interlocking melodies and rhythm, abrupt changes in tempo, as well as syncopated rhythm and humorous vocals. Calung (the ensemble) is present at many celebratory gatherings, and its dancers are sometimes related to prostitution.

On November 18, 2010, UNESCO officially recognized the Indonesian angklung which includes a musical instrument of calung as a Masterpiece of the Oral and Intangible Heritage of Humanity, and encouraged the Indonesian people and the Indonesian government to safeguard, transmit, promote performances and to encourage the craftsmanship of the angklung. In 2011, calung traditions are recognized as National Intangible Cultural Heritage of Indonesia by the Indonesian Ministry of Education and Culture.

== Etymology ==
Calung is actually the name for the Diospyros macrophylla tree in Sundanese language (ki calung, literally: calung wood), as a musical instrument, according to the A Dictionary of the Sunda language by Jonathan Rigg (1862), calung is a rude musical instrument so called, being half a dozen slips of bambu fastened to a string, like the steps of a ladder, and when hung up, tapped with a bit of wood.

== Instrument ==
The calung works by cutting away multiple pieces of bamboo tubes to create a pitch when struck. To make the Calung in the Sundanese tradition, a set of bamboo tubes are strung together through holes cut into the tubes. You are then able to play the Calung either suspended; you play the tubes while they are in hanging in front of you, or you can put them across a bamboo frame and play it like a xylophone.

== Gallery ==
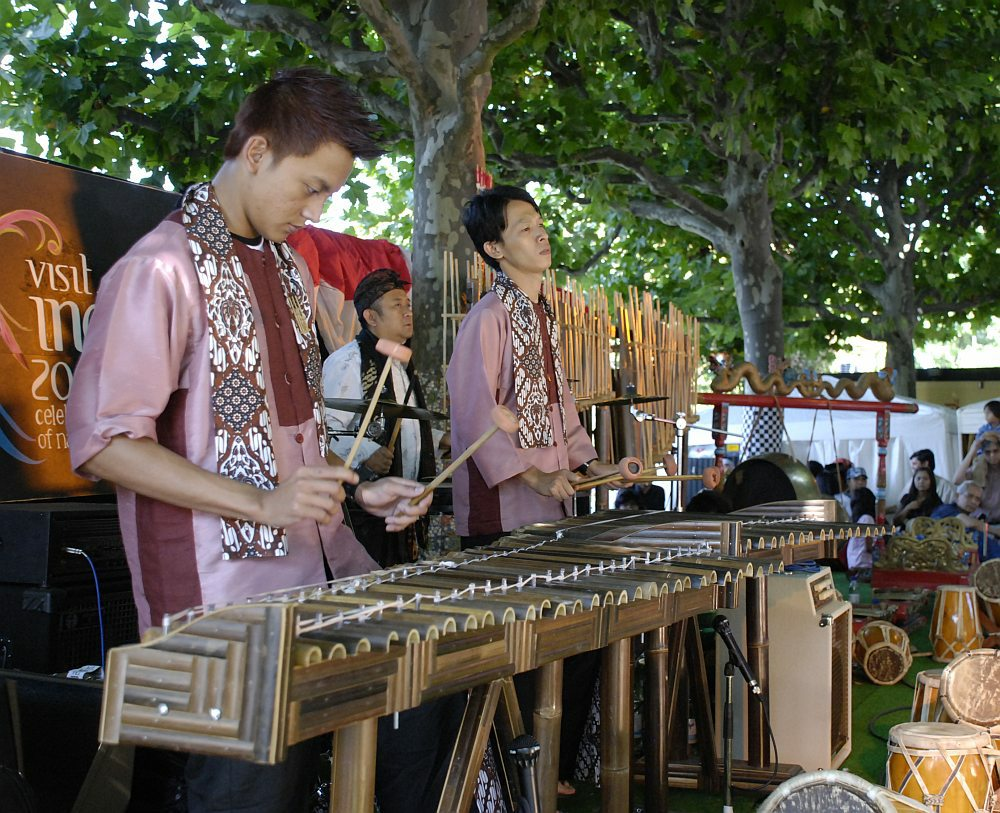
Calung performance in Frankfurt, Germany.

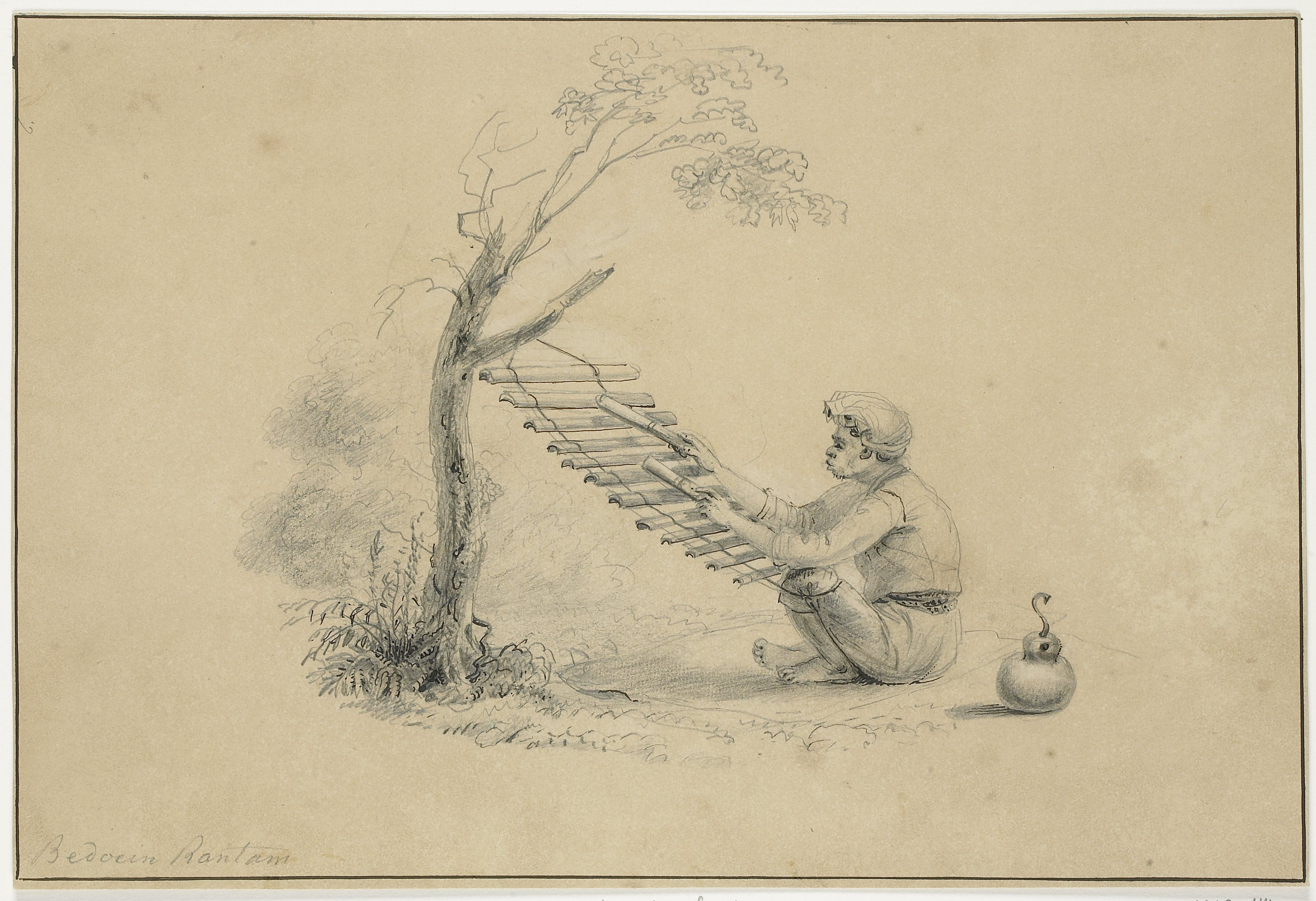
An illustration of a Sundanese Baduy man playing a calung by Jannes Theodorus Bik, c. 1816–1846 (this picture taken from the anthropological collection pictures of Rijksmuseum Amsterdam).

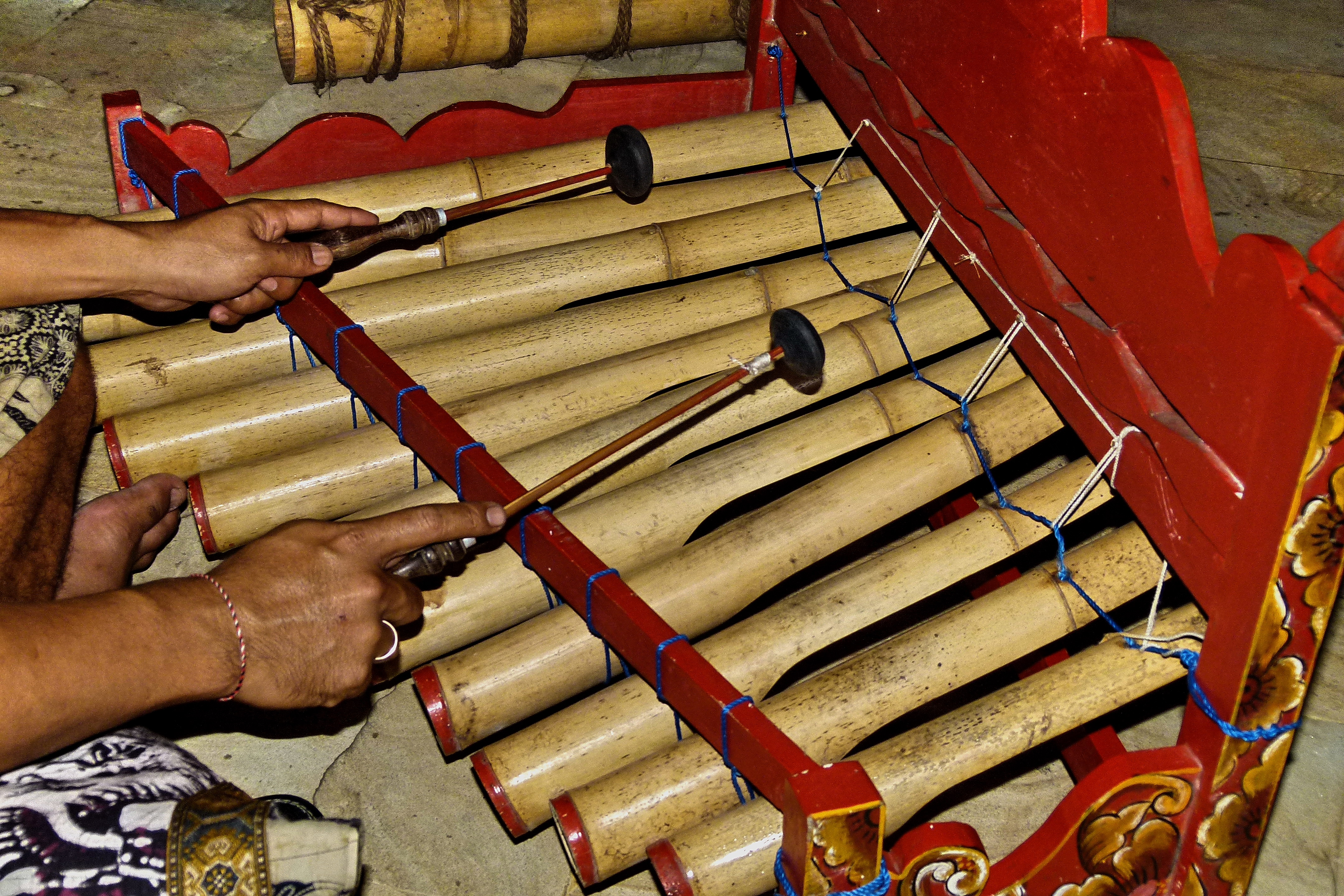
A Rindhik musical instrument (Balinese calung style) from Bali, Indonesia.

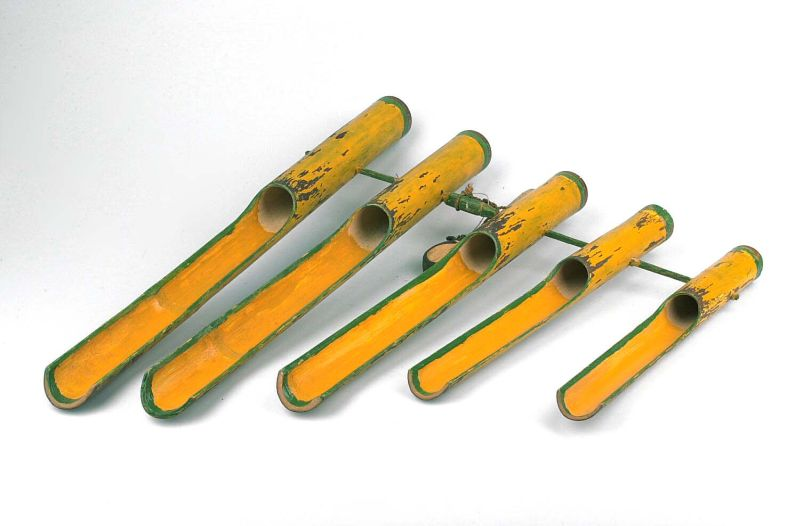
Calung Jinjing

== See also ==
- Gamelan
- Music of Sunda
- Music of Java
- Music of Bali
