= Gamelan gong gede =

Indonesian traditional musical instruments

Gamelan gong gede, meaning "gamelan with the large gongs", is a form of the ceremonial gamelan music of Bali, dating from the court society of the fifteenth and sixteenth centuries, associated historically with public ceremonies and special occasions such as temple festivals.

== Style ==
Usually performed by a temple orchestra of over forty musicians, music written for the gong gede is sedate and graceful, following an andante tempo. It fluctuates in cycles, one fast, one slow, one loud, and one soft. The beat is provided by the largest gong.

== Popularity ==
During their colonization of Bali in the late nineteenth century, the Dutch dissolved the courts. The use of the gong gede became limited to temple music. It was later superseded in popularity by gong kebyar, a more up-tempo form of gamelan played with smaller gongs, that originated in Balinese villages in the late 19th century and became widely popular in the 1920s and 1930s.

== See also ==
- Gamelan
- Gong kebyar
- Joged bumbung
- Salendro
- Gamelan semar pegulingan

== Citations ==
- Cooke, Mervyn (1998). Britten and the Far East: Asian Influences in the Music of Benjamin Britten. Boydell & Brewer. ISBN 9780851158303.
- Mantle Hood, Made (2011). Triguna: A Hindu-Balinese Philosophy for Gamelan Gong Gede Music. LIT Verlag Münster. ISBN 9783825812300.
- McPhee, Colin (1966). Music in Bali: a study in form and instrumental organization in Balinese orchestral music. Yale University Press.
- Tenzer, Michael (2000). Gamelan Gong Kebyar: The Art of Twentieth-Century Balinese Music. University of Chicago Press. ISBN 9780226792811.
- Terry E. Miller; Sean Williams, eds. (2008). The Garland Handbook of Southeast Asian Music. Routledge. ISBN 9780415960755.
