= Ombak =

Beating (shimmer) produced by paired tuning in Balinese gamelan

Beating produced by two close frequencies. In Balinese gamelan, ombak refers to intentionally produced beating created by slightly detuned paired instruments.

Ombak (Balinese/Indonesian: wave) is the characteristic beating (“shimmer”) produced in many Balinese gamelan ensembles when paired instruments, or paired keys/bars for the same pitch, are tuned slightly apart and sounded together. Ombak is a designed timbral feature of an ensemble and is closely connected to Balinese paired-tuning practice.

== Concept and terminology ==
Ombak is a term used for the shimmering quality that results from acoustic beating in Balinese gamelan sound. In many Balinese ensemble contexts, the paired components of a pitch are described as complementary partners, often glossed as a lower and a higher member of the pair, commonly reported as pengumbang and pengisep, though terminology varies by ensemble and author.

Some authors also use the term getaran (“vibrations”) for the same acoustical-beating phenomenon in Balinese gamelan sound and discuss ombak in terms of beat-rate differences measured in cycles per second (Hz).

== How ombak is produced ==
=== Paired tuning ===
Many Balinese gamelan metallophones are made in pairs, with the two partners tuned a few hertz apart so that striking them together generates beating identified as ombak. An acoustics work on Balinese gongs and metallophones also notes that paired detuning is a purposeful design feature and explicitly identifies the resulting beating as ombak.

=== Acoustic beating ===
Beat frequency illustrated by summing close-frequency sinusoids. In Balinese gamelan, ombak is the beating produced when paired tones are tuned slightly apart.

In physical terms, beating occurs when two close frequencies are heard together and the combined waveform produces an amplitude fluctuation; the beat rate is approximately the frequency difference between the two tones in simple cases. Psychoacoustic work on amplitude fluctuation and roughness provides a general framework for how beating is perceived, as a tremolo-like modulation at slower rates and increasing roughness at faster rates. In Balinese gamelan, the audible character of ombak also reflects the spectra and decay patterns of inharmonic percussion instruments, not only idealized pure tones.

== Rates and variation ==
Ombak is not fixed at a single universal rate, since measurement-based studies describe typical ranges and differences across ensemble types. For example, practitioner- and research-oriented discussions describe different preferred ombak rates for gong kebyar, gender wayang, and angklung ensembles, with the rate kept approximately consistent across registers within a given ensemble in many tuning approaches. The Bali 1928 documentation similarly describes genre-linked differences, giving example ranges for kebyar, gender wayang, and other repertories in terms of cycles per second.

Measurement-based work describes ombak as a tunable parameter and quantifies variation across large datasets of complete gamelan sets. One analytical study links ombak rate to octave treatment (“octave stretching”) and models their relationship using tuning data from multiple ensembles. A broader analysis of dozens of complete gong kebyar tunings, including data from the Toth archives, discusses systematic regularities and ensemble-to-ensemble variability in paired detuning and interval structure, and attributes early descriptions of the interdependence between ombak and octave treatment to Andrew Toth’s field measurements and interviews with tuners.

A music-technology survey similarly uses “ombak rate” as a central descriptor in comparing Balinese tunings and emphasizes that ombak and other tuning parameters vary across ensembles and contexts.

== Metallophones: spectra and mode shapes ==
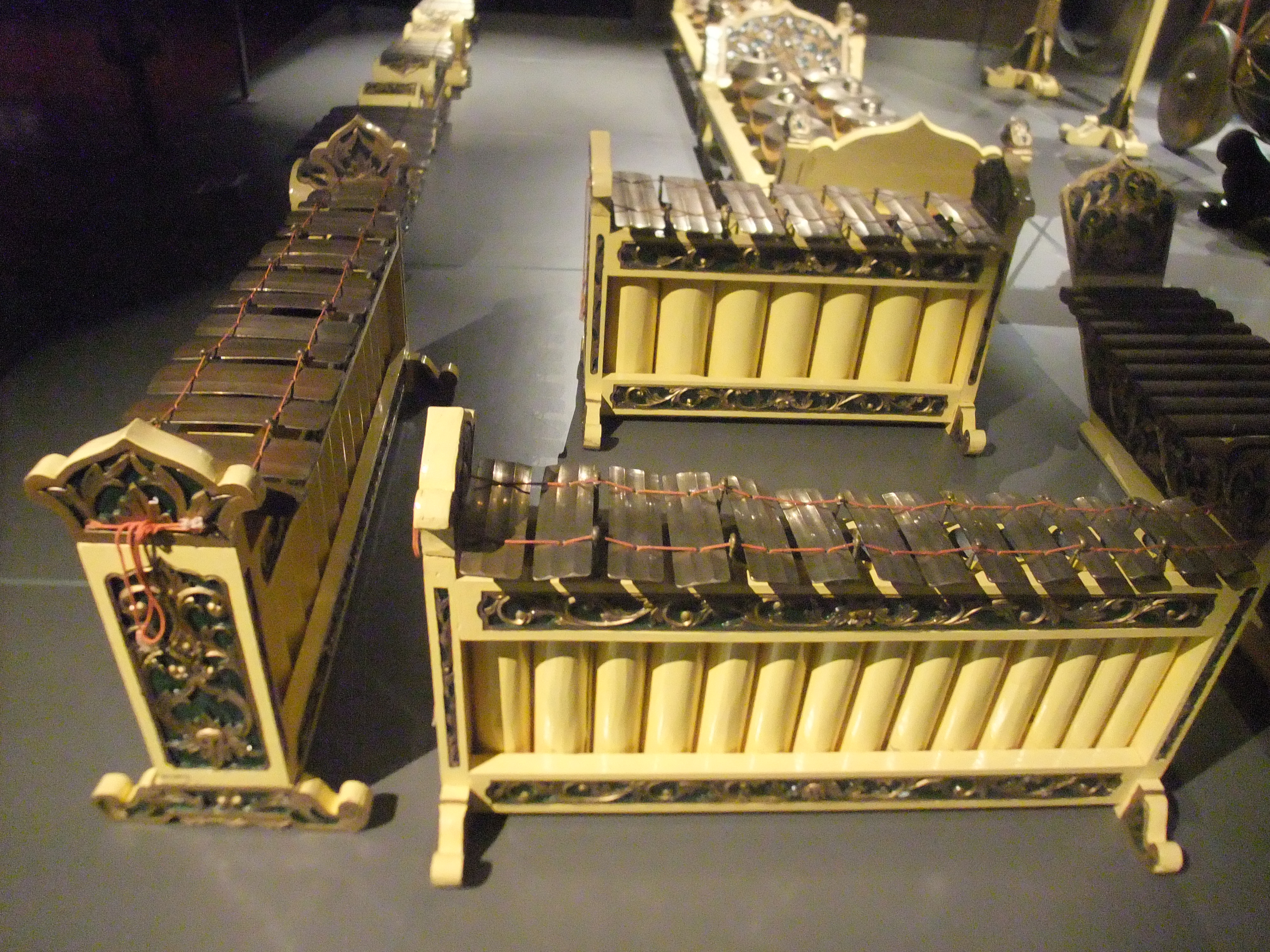
A metallophone (saron/metallophone family). In many Balinese gamelan, metallophones are tuned in paired partners so the slight detuning produces ombak (audible beating) when played together.

Ombak in paired metallophones is shaped by the vibrational behavior of the bars and resonators. Scanning laser Doppler vibrometry and acoustical recording of a full Balinese semara dana metallophone section found large variability in prominent overtones and mode shapes across bars and instruments, and explicitly connects paired detuning to the generation of a “shimmery acoustic beating called ombak.”

More generally, modal-analysis methods, including vibrometry and related techniques, are widely used in percussion acoustics for understanding how instruments radiate sound and how their vibrational modes relate to timbre, which provides methodological context for gamelan instrument studies.

== Large gongs: multiple sources of beating ==
Ombak has also been investigated in large Balinese gongs, particularly the gong ageng wadon. A study using acoustical and vibrometry measurements reports that the gong’s distinct beating has two sources: (1) closely spaced structural modes, with asymmetric patterns suggested to reflect deliberate hammering during forging, and (2) beating components produced by nonlinear response when the gong is struck, including intermodulation effects that generate additional closely spaced frequencies. This highlights the roles of hammered mode structures and nonlinear distortion in producing strong beating.

== Relationship to octave treatment ==
Because paired detuning is often maintained at an approximately constant beat rate across registers in some Balinese ensemble practices, octave tuning may be adjusted (“stretched” or “compressed”) so that perceived pitch relationships remain musically functional when the ear averages the two partners in a beating pair. Analytical modeling work shows this as an interdependent system: ombak rate and octave tempering can be jointly modeled to fit measured tunings from complete gamelan sets.

== Musical and cultural role ==
Ombak is frequently described as a defining aspect of Balinese ensemble sonority and is commonly discussed in connection with the broader Balinese approach to ensemble individuality and tuning variability across villages and gamelan sets.

Historical and comparative scholarship on Indonesian tone measurement situates ombak within a longer tradition of documenting gamelan tunings and their diversity across ensembles and time. More recent ethnographic work on the ongoing reconstruction of specific Balinese gamelan sets emphasizes that instrumentation and tuning can change across an ensemble’s “life,” which can include changes affecting paired-tuning relations and sonic identity.

Ombak is sometimes referenced as a point of contrast in newly built or experimental Balinese ensembles that alter standard pairing conventions; one discussion of composer Dewa Alit’s Gamelan Salukat notes cases where instruments were not arranged in pairs “with which to create ombak,” framing ombak as a typical expectation in many Balinese settings.

== See also ==
- Balinese gamelan
- Gamelan
- Musical tuning
- Inharmonicity
