= Gamelan joged bumbung =

Indonesian traditional musical instruments

Joged bumbung is a style of gamelan music from Bali, Indonesia played on instruments made primarily out of bamboo. The ensemble gets its name from joged, a flirtatious dance often performed at festivals and parties. This style of Gamelan is especially popular in Northern and Western Bali, but is easily found all over the island. Unlike many styles of Balinese Gamelan which have sacred roles in religious festivals, Joged music is much more secular, and in many ways has become the folk music of Bali. With the rapid rise of tourism in recent decades, Joged music is now often found being performed at hotels and restaurants.

The bamboo instruments of the Joged, called Grantang (or commonly Tingklik in central Bali), are marimba-like instruments made out of bamboo. 11 to 14 bamboo canes, split halfway down their length, are then carved so that a closed tube resonator remains on the un-split half. The completed keys are mounted to a wooden or bamboo frame with string or rubber strips. Striking the keys with rubber tipped mallets called pangguls results in a dry sound with little sustain. The instruments are played with both hands: the left hand plays the melody on the lower register, while the right hand plays a faster elaborated version of the melody. When the fast elaboration is too fast for one person to play alone, it is broken into two interlocking parts in a style called Kotekan.

Most ensembles are tuned to a slendro scale, except in Northern and Western Bali where pelog scales are more common. A typical ensemble will have 4 to 6 grantangs and are accompanied by Suling (flutes), Kendang (Drum), Ceng-ceng (cymbals), and a beat keeping instrument made out of bamboo or bronze. There will also be gongs of various types and a larger bass gramtang called a Jegog playing the underlying melody. In recent years ensembles that incorporate bronze instruments have become more popular and often play compositions from the Gamelan Gong Kebyar repertoire.

== See also ==
- Gamelan
- Jegog
- Music of Indonesia
