= Michael Tenzer =

American musician (born 1957)

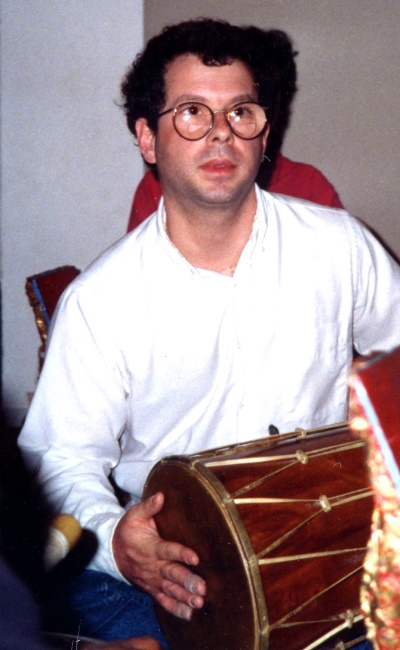
- Born: 1957 (age 68–69); New York City

Michael Tenzer (born 1957) is a composer, performer, and music educator and scholar.

== Career ==
Tenzer was born in New York City and studied music at Yale University (BA. 1978) and University of California, Berkeley (Ph.D. 1986). After teaching at Yale from 1986 to 1996, he moved to University of British Columbia where he teaches ethnomusicology, composition, music theory and gamelan performance, and co-directs the doctoral program in ethnomusicology.

Tenzer's compositions for chamber, solo and orchestral media have been performed in North America, Europe, and Asia, featuring performers such as Pandit Swapan Chaudhuri (tabla), Alex Klein (oboe) and Evan Ziporyn (clarinet). His publications have been recognized with the Society for Ethnomusicology's Alan P. Merriam Prize (best book of 2000) and the 34th annual ASCAP-Deems Taylor award, and his research has been supported with grants from the National Endowment for the Humanities and Fulbright. Among his composition prizes are a Library of Congress/Koussevitzky commission for a chamber work, Sources of Current. After its premiere the New York Times called it "deft, sophisticated and inventive." He received the Charles Ives Center award for his percussion quartet (1981), the DiLorenzo prize for the octet Daya (1985) for string quartet and clarinets, and the Morse Fellowship to complete his Symphony for Strings (1988). Tenzer's music is available on New World, Cantaloupe and Bali Stereo labels.

Since 1977, Tenzer has been deeply involved with the gamelan music of Bali, Indonesia. He carried out several years of research and writing about it on a series of fellowships, among them a Fulbright (1982), a grant from the Asian Cultural Council (1987) the Morse Fellowship (1989), and a National Endowment for the Humanities University Teacher's Fellowship (1994). An experienced performer and teacher of gamelan, Tenzer is the author of two books on the subject: Balinese Music (Periplus: 1991; 2nd ed. 1998) and Gamelan Gong Kebyar: The Art of 20th Century Balinese Music. More recently he published Analytical Studies in World Music (Oxford 2006). He was the first Western composer invited to compose for Balinese ensembles in Bali and has completed a series of works of an increasingly experimental character for the gamelan since 1982, among them Sinar Jegog (1985), Situ Banda ("Bridge of Monkeys"; 1989), Banyuari ("Tributary"; 1992), Talakalam for gamelan with tabla (1999), "Puser Belah" for 2 simultaneous gamelan ("Unstable Center"; 2003), and "Buk Katah" for gamelan with a nonet of brass, winds and piano ("Underleaf"; 2006). These works have been cited by Balinese critics as "an important and unique contribution to our cultural heritage". The last three compositions cited plus others are featured on the 2009 CD Let Others Name You on New World records. In 1979, Tenzer co-founded the Sekar Jaya gamelan ensemble in Berkeley, California, an organization of Americans dedicated to the performance of Balinese arts that is now internationally known. He founded Gamelan Gita Asmara in 2001 in Vancouver.
