= Gamelan selunding =

Indonesian traditional musical instruments

Gamelan selunding (also spelled selonding) is a sacred ensemble of gamelan music from Bali, Indonesia. The selunding ensemble is from Tenganan, a village in east Bali; the ensemble is rare. Selunding means "great" or "large". Selonding is also a musical instrument made of iron.

== See also ==
- Gamelan
- Beleganjur
- Gong kebyar
