= Beleganjur =

Indonesian traditional musical instruments

Gamelan Belenganjur
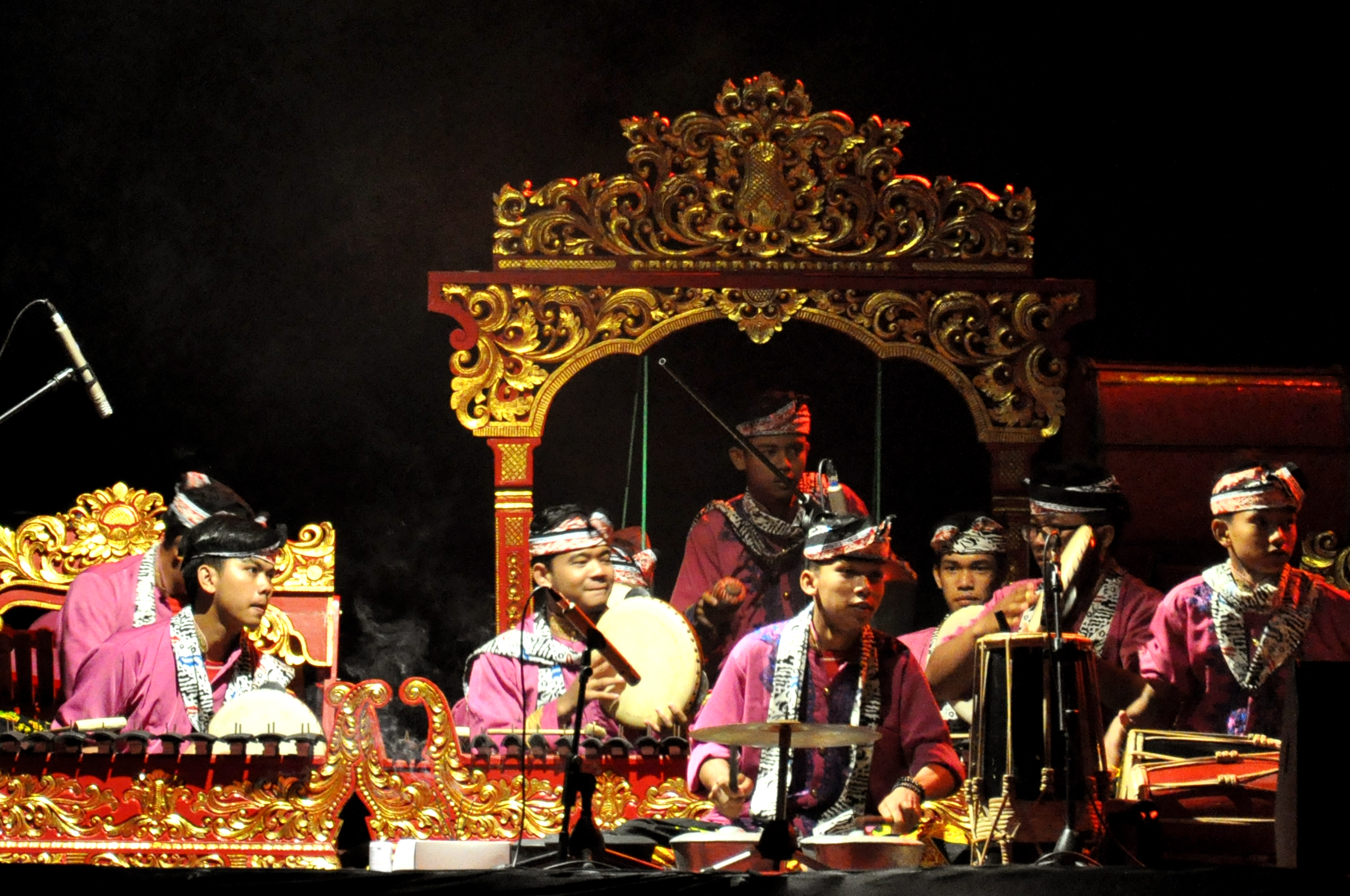
- Belenganjur player
- Developed: Indonesia

Gamelan beleganjur (also spelled balaganjur, Balinese: ᬩᭂᬍᬕᬜ᭄ᬚᬸᬃ, Balinese pronunciation: [bə.lə.ɡaɲ.d͡ʒur]) is one of the most popular styles of gamelan music in Bali. Its closest Western analogue is probably the Western military band.

== History ==
The original purpose of beleganjur was to accompany armies into battle and strike fear into the hearts of the enemy. In fact, gamelan beleganjur literally means "gamelan of walking warriors". Also like its Western counterpart, today beleganjur has mostly lost its association with warfare, and instead is associated with festivals, contests, and cremation ceremonies - modeled on the modern marching band and the Javanese tanjidor tradition to the west.

Although the origin of beleganjur is uncertain, it bears resemblance to the now rare gamelan gong bheri.

== Instrumentation ==
The most primitive beleganjur ensemble, known as bebatelan, consisted of only nine instruments:

- one "great gong": gong ageng;
- one secondary gong, with sunken boss instead of the usual raised one: bendé;
- four pairs of cymbals: (ceng-ceng);
- two differently tuned drums, considered male and female: kendang;
- one small handheld gong that acts as a metronome: kempli.

The drums and cymbals generally play interlocking patterns over the ostinato of the gongan gong cycle.

Though bebatelan itself is rarely heard nowadays, its instrumentation forms the nucleus of the more complex modern ensemble: beleganjur bebonangan. The additional instrumentation of the beleganjur bebonangan ensemble is:

- a second gong ageng, forming a male/female pair of gongs;
- a medium-sized gong: kempur;
- four additional ceng-ceng to total of eight
- two tuned hand-held metal pot-gongs: ponggang;
- four similar but higher-pitched pot-gongs: bonang
- bamboo suling vertical flutes in some bands

The bonang are identical to the individual pots of the reyong; in fact, many groups simply remove the pots from the frame of a reyong so they can double as bonang, and bonang are often referred to as reyong for this reason. The ponggang usually play a characteristic ostinato pattern while the bonang play more complex interlocking patterns known as kotekan.

== Cultural role ==
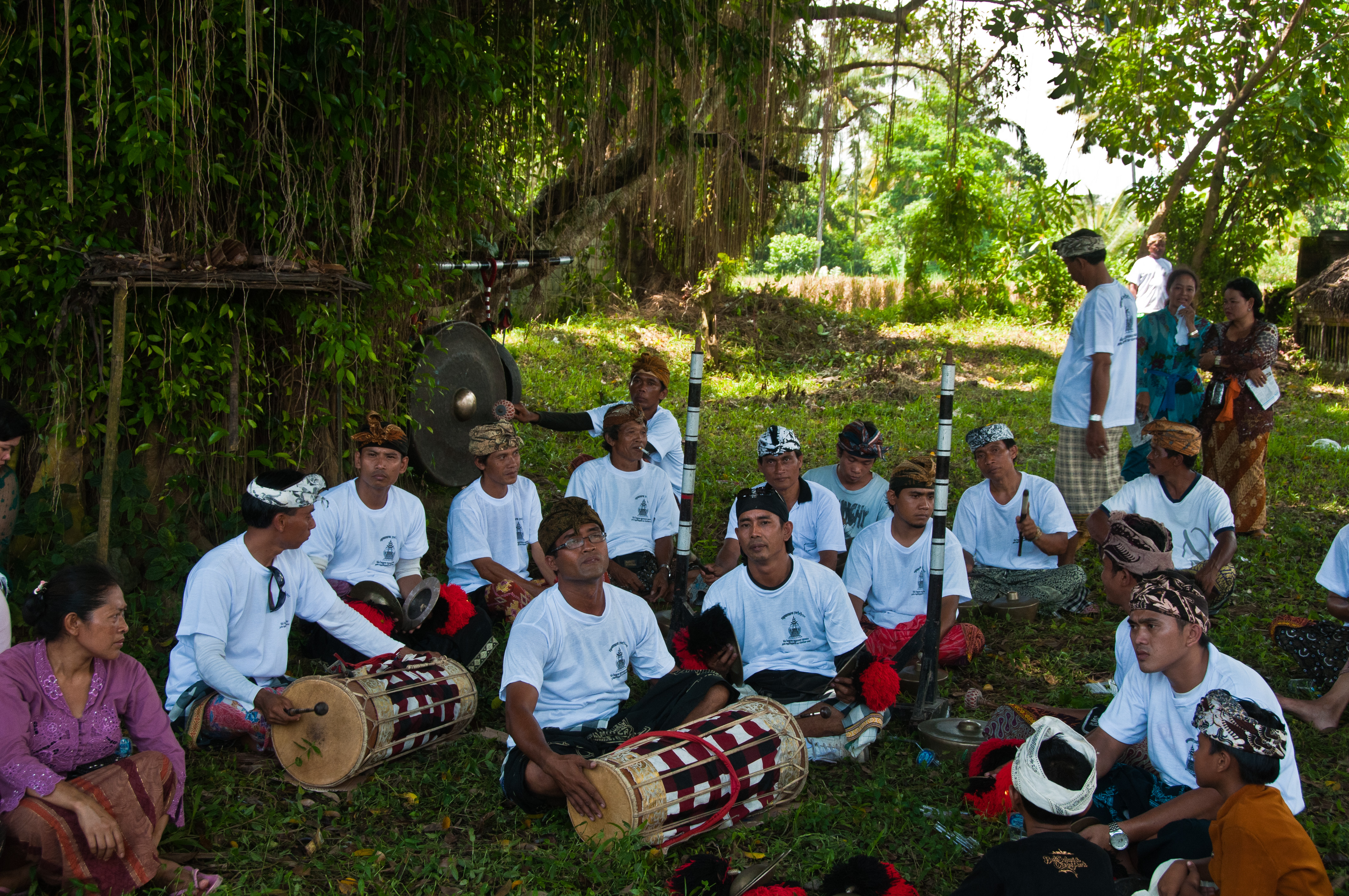
A gamelan Belenganjur player playing for the procession and cremation (ngaben) ceremony in Bali, Indonesia.

Gamelan beleganjur is essential to the Hindu religious ceremonies of Bali, such as the ogoh-ogoh parades before the Balinese New Year, Nyepi. There are rites to appease evil spirits and honor good ones, temple festivals to celebrate the anniversary of a temple's dedication, and cremation ceremonies to cleanse the souls of the deceased and prepare them for reincarnation. Though some ceremonies are associated with other specific kinds of gamelan, notably cremation ceremonies with gamelan angklung, beleganjur is nevertheless ubiquitous and often takes the place of other kinds of gamelan if they are not available.

== See also ==
- Gamelan
- Gambang
- Gong kebyar
