= Gamelan jegog =

Indonesian traditional musical instruments

Gamelan Jegog
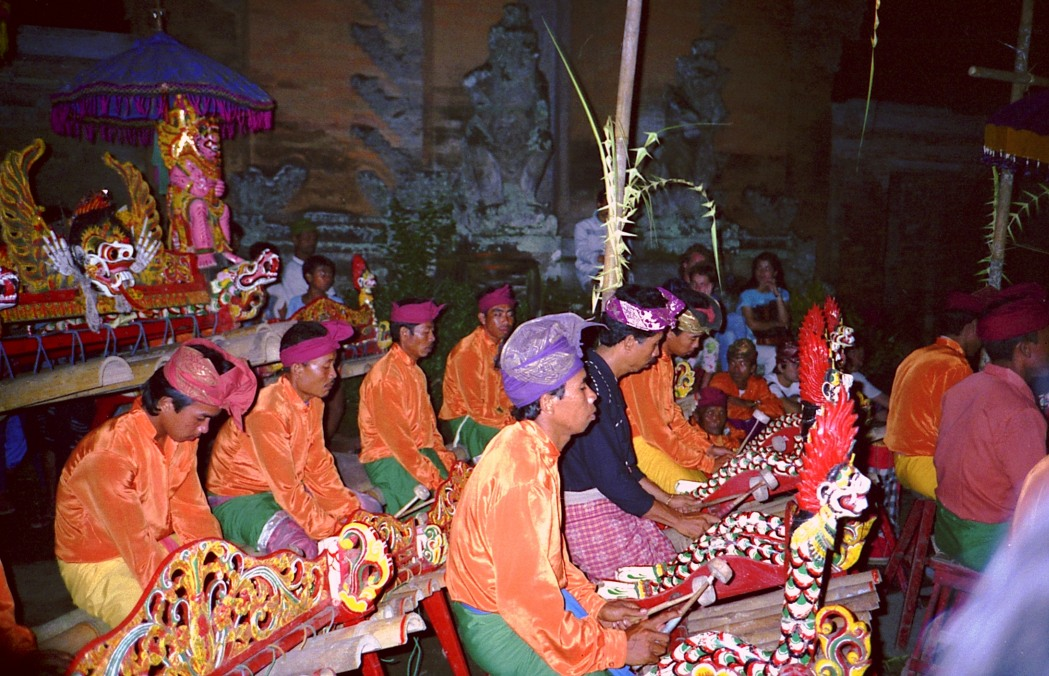
- A Gamelan Jegog performance in 1989
- Inventor: Balinese
- Developed: Indonesia

Jegog is a form of gamelan music indigenous to Bali, Indonesia, played on instruments made of bamboo. The tradition of jegog is centered in Jembrana, a region in Western Bali. In recent years jegog has started to become popular in other regions of Bali with a few groups being established in central Bali to entertain tourists. International interest has been spread by tourists visiting Bali and by recordings. There are virtually no ensembles outside of Bali with the exception of at least two groups in Japan (Sekar Sakura and Geinoh Yamashirogumi, the latter's having been used in 4 of the tracks in their score for the film Akira and the final track of Ecophony Rinne), one in the United States (Sekar Jaya) and one in Germany. Jegog music is very fast, loud, rhythmic and precise. Pieces last from a few minutes to as long as thirty minutes.

== Instruments ==
Jegog instruments have a four-note scale that roughly corresponds to the four pitches of a dominant 7th chord in Western music. All instruments have eight bamboo keys. Some instruments have two keys for each pitch slightly detuned so that the pitches beat when they are played together. Other instruments have a two octave range with four pitches in a low octave and the same four pitches an octave higher. In this case the instrument will be paired with another instrument that is slightly detuned. Taken together the ensemble has a range of five octaves.

Most jegog ensembles have instruments that have keys that are made of bamboo that are split at one end and then half of the tube is removed. The other end remains intact and functions as a resonator for the split part. The keys are suspended on a wooden frame and struck with mallets (panggul), made of wood or rubber. There are also jegog ensembles with instruments called jegog tingklik. These smaller instruments are used primarily with children. The keys are made of bamboo slats mounted above a resonator box.

=== Jegog ===
The lowest instrument in a jegog ensemble is also called a jegog. The ensemble gets its name from this instrument. The keys of the jegog instrument are as long as 3 meters in length and a pitch as low as 60 hertz. The instrument is so large, and the mallets are so heavy that it takes two people to play it. The players crouch on a platform on the top of the instrument and alternate playing the keys. The jegog instrument has the lowest octave of the ensemble. Each pair of pitches are detuned by as much as 7 hertz. In this octave, that is almost a whole tone. The keys are arranged 1' 2' 3' 4' 1 2 3 4, one being the lowest pitch and 4 being the highest. The four keys on the left are the higher pitches of the detuned pairs and the four on the right are the lower ones.

=== Melodic Instruments ===
One octave higher than the jegog is an instrument called the undir, and an octave above that is the kuntung. In recent years the kuntung is often called a celuluk. The instruments are small enough to be played by one person each. The undir is still big enough that the player needs to crouch on a platform on the top of it to play it. There are two undir and two kuntung. The undir and kuntung have the same arrangement of keys as the jegog but in higher octaves. These five instruments together play the melody (bun). Some ensembles have a high pitch flute called a suling that also plays the melody.

=== Kotekan instruments ===
Each of the remaining 9 instruments span two octaves and are arranged 1 2 3 4 5 6 7 8 where 5 through 8 is an octave above 1 to 4. The lowest of these instruments, called the barangan, span the same octaves as the undir and the kuntung. The next higher is the kancil which begins with the octave of the kuntung and extends an octave higher. The next higher—the highest in the ensemble—is the suir, likewise, extending one octave higher. There are three barangan, three kancil, and three suir.

The barangan often plays the melody twice as fast as the other melody instruments. Since this is often very fast, the players alternate playing the notes. The kancil and suir play interlocking patterns called kotekan, sometimes the barangan play these patterns as well. The barangan are the front line of the ensemble. The center of the three barangan is the leader of the ensemble. Other players watch the leader for cues and tempo changes.

=== Instrumentation variations ===
A smaller version of a gamelan jegog might not have the 2 kuntung and the 3 suir. This smaller ensemble has a longer history than the one outlined above.

If a gamelan jegog is accompanying dance, it may be augmented by kendang (drums), ceng-ceng (cymbals) and tawa-tawa (a beat-keeping small gong).

== See also ==
- Gamelan
- Gambang
- Gender wayang
- Joged bumbung
