= Gamelan gong kebyar =

Indonesian traditional musical instruments

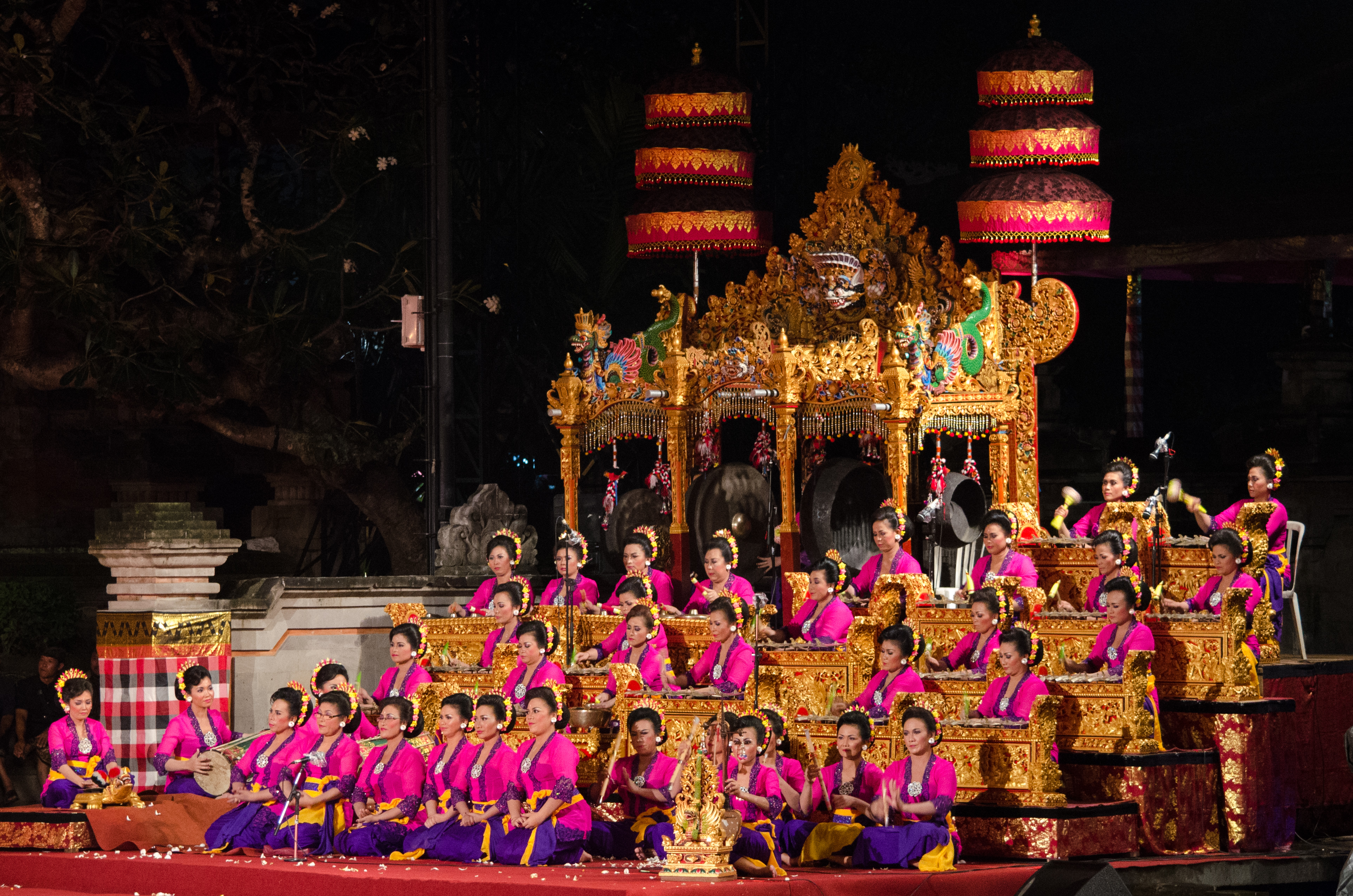
- Women gamelan played on opposite sides of a large open stage while dancers performed
- Inventor: Balinese
- Developed: Indonesia

Gamelan gong kebyar is a style or genre of Balinese gamelan music of Indonesia. Kebyar means "to flare up or burst open", and refers to the explosive changes in tempo and dynamics characteristic of the style.

Gong kebyar music is based on a five-tone scale called pelog selisir (tones 1, 2, 3, 5, and 6 of the 7-tone pelog scale), and is characterized by brilliant sounds, syncopations, sudden and gradual changes in sound colour, dynamics, tempo and articulation, and complex, complementary interlocking melodic and rhythmic patterns called kotekan.

== History ==
Gamelan gong kebyar was first documented to exist in North Bali in the early 1900s. The first public performance was in December 1915 at a gamelan gong competition in Jagaraga, North Bali.

Following their invasion of the island, Dutch occupiers responded to international criticism by building cultural institutions. They sponsored these competitions until Japanese forces ended their rule in World War II.

== Religious and cultural significance ==
In addition to island-wide arts competitions, gamelan gong kebyar has become an essential part of modern Bali Hindu ceremonies. They are required for annual birthday ceremonies for temples, odalan, as well as major holidays as accompaniment for sacred dances. They are also appropriate for the class of rituals centered around human life, Putra Manusia, such as weddings.

== Instruments ==
Instruments in gamelan gong kebyar offer a wide range of pitches and timbres, ranging five octaves from the deepest gongs to the highest key on a gangsa. The high end can be described as "piercing", the low end "booming and sustained," while the drums as "crisp". Kebyar instruments are most often grouped in pairs, or "gendered." Each pair consists of a male and female instrument, the female being slightly larger and slightly lower in pitch. See the tuning section in this article for more information.

=== Keyed instruments ===
Most instruments in kebyar are keyed metallophones, with bronze keys resting on suspended chords, over bamboo resonators. The instruments often have ornately carved wooden frames. The gangsa section in gamelan gong kebyar is the largest section, consisting of 13-14 players. Gangsa instruments are played with a mallet, called a panggul gangsa. The mallet differs in hardness depending on the instrument and its range. The keys are arranged from low to high, left to right. The key is struck with the hammer in one hand, and damped with the finger and second knuckle of the other hand. The keys can be played in one of three ways:

1. Strike the key, and let resonate until sound fades.
2. Strike the key, and damp immediately prior to, or simultaneous with, the striking of the next note in the melody. This is especially good for interlocking parts.
3. Strike while damping. This gets a dry, pitched click.

The gangsa instruments play elaborate ornamentations (flowers) on the underlying melody (pokok, or trunk of the tree) of a piece of music. The explosive feeling of the gong kebyar style derives mainly from the dynamic range of these instruments, whose bright, sharp tones can sound anywhere from soft and sweet to extremely loud and aggressive. Each gendered male/female pair of gangsa is also divided into two interlocking melodic parts, polos (mostly plays on the beat) and the sangsih (mostly plays off the beat) during kotekan, which permits extremely rapid, virtuosic, and complex patterns to be played.

==== Gangsa kantilan ====
There are four kantilan in kebyar, two male and two female. See gendered instruments within this article. These instruments are the highest sounding in the kebyar ensemble, with its highest note being around C7. It has ten keys, and a range of two octaves, and is played with a wooden hammer. Players often sit on the floor to play this instrument.

==== Gangsa pemadé ====
There are also four pemadé in kebyar, two male and two female. These instruments also have ten keys, a range of two octaves, and are played with a wooden mallet, but are exactly one octave lower than kantilan. Players often sit on the floor to play this instrument.

==== Ugal ====
There is often only one ugal in the kebyar ensemble, and it is usually female. It is played by one of the leaders of the ensemble. A second, male ugal is sometimes used. The ugal is taller than the other gangsa, and the player sits on a short stool, so as to allow the player to cue the ensemble visually with ease. The instrument also has 10 keys, with a range of two octaves, and is played with a hard wooden mallet, slightly larger than the other gangsa panguls and usually with additional ornamentations so the leader's sometimes theatrical cues actively catch the light. Its notes are an octave lower than those of the gangsa pemadé. The ugals play a combination of gangsa parts and cues, melodic solos, and the underlying melody with flourishes. The first, front ugal cues and plays elements of the polos interlocking gangsa part (the part that plays more often on the beat), and if there is a second ugal, it plays elements of the sangsih part (gangsa notes more often off the beat).

==== Jublag ====
Higher in pitch than the jegog is the jublag (or chalung; see related xylophone calung). This instrument, like jegog, also requires long resonating bamboo tubes so is often played while sitting on a small stool, and consists of one female/male pair. These instruments have a range of one octave, in between pemadé and ugal. Some have five keys (1, 2, 3, 5, and 6) but seven key jublag are also commonly found in Bali (though gong kebyar ensembles typically do not use notes 4 and 7, using only the pelog selisir scale). It usually plays at submultiples of the pokok; the keys are struck more frequently than the jegogan and usually less frequently than the ugal (playing the pokok). The jublag part is often the full pokok while the ugal part includes some ornamentations and flourishes; however, the jublag do not play full kebyar sequences, for example. This instrument is one octave above the jegogan and overlaps tones with the ugal.

==== Jegogan ====
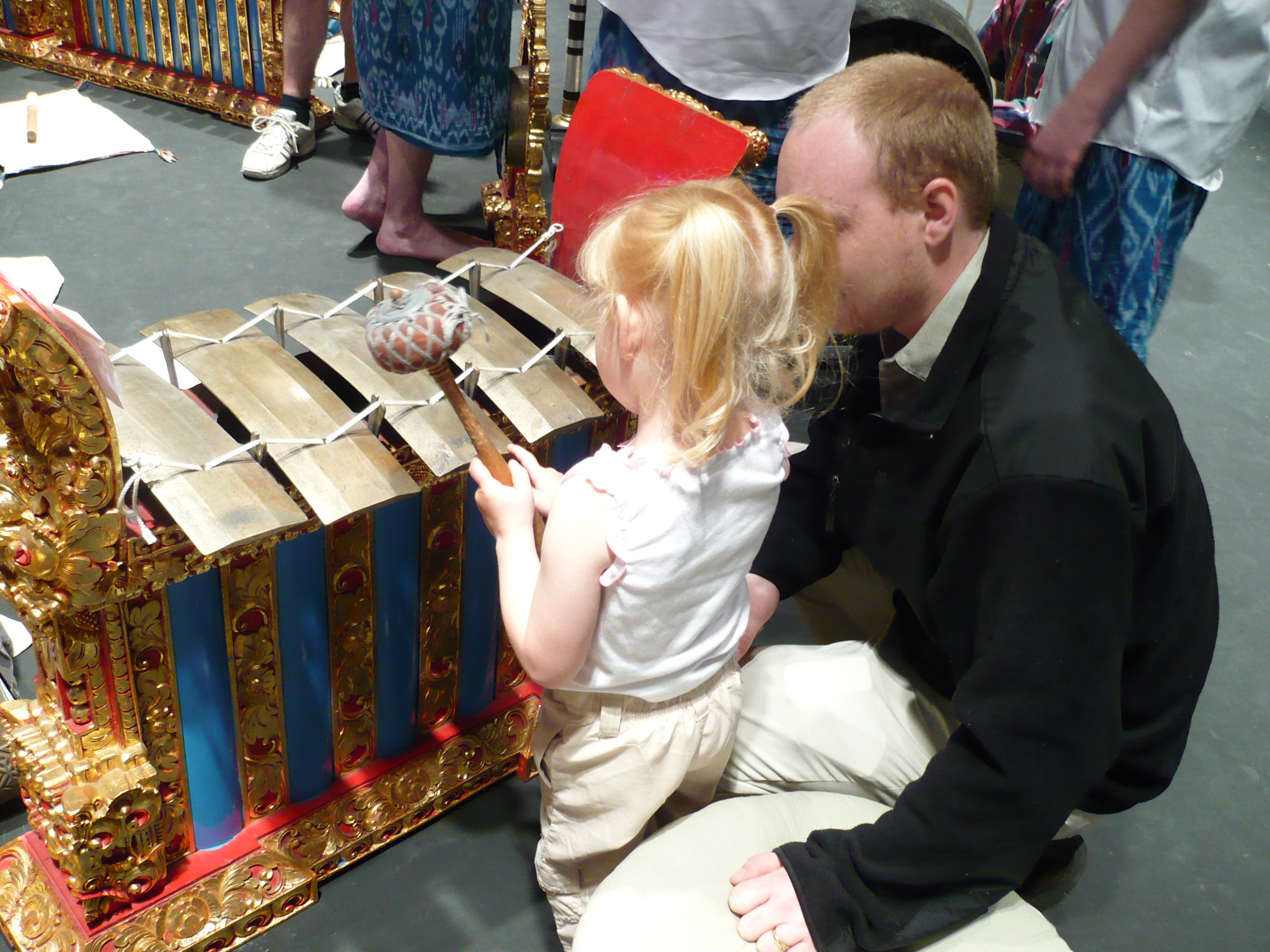
A jegogan

There are two jegogan (shortened to "jegog" in everyday speech) in kebyar, one male and one female. These instruments have a range of one fifth, and are one octave below jublag. The keys are considerably larger than those of other gangsa, and are played with a large, cloth-coated, rubber-padded spherical mallet. The jegogan plays the deepest tuned notes in the ensemble, typically playing key notes in the underlying melody of a piece of music instead of every note of that melody.

=== Vertically suspended gong family ===
Gongs come in different sizes, and provide a structure for phrasing for the music by repeating a four or eight beat pattern. This pattern is called the gong cycle. Gongs are mounted vertically.

==== Gong gedé ====
Also referred to as just gong, gong gedé is the deepest, and most resonant. Gede, sometimes written gde, means 'big' in Balinese. Because it is the largest of the gongs, it is considered to be the most sacred instrument in kebyar. It is never damped, always allowed to decay. Because of its deep tone, it penetrates through the ensemble and can be heard for miles. It is struck with a large, padded mallet.

==== Kempur ====
A medium-sized gong, the kempur is very similar to gong gedé as it has very similar qualities, but is just higher in pitch (about an octave and a fifth higher). It is struck with a large, padded mallet.

==== Klentong ====
Also known as the kemong, this is much smaller and higher in pitch than the kempur. It is struck with a harder mallet than either the gong gedé or kempur, which allows it to have a sharper attack.

=== Kettle gong family ===
Kettle gongs are round, bronze, and pitched. They are often mounted horizontally on suspended chords as part of a frame. Positioned this way, there is an opening on the bottom, slightly beveled bow on top, and a protruding center called the boss. The kettles are arranged from low to high, left to right. They are generally played with a wooden mallet wrapped in string on one end (to soften the attack) or the end of the mallet, which is bare, finished wood. Mallets are held one in each hand as extensions of pointed index fingers. There are four conventional strikes:

1. On the boss with the stringed part of the mallet, and immediately released to let it vibrate freely.
2. On the boss with the stringed part of the mallet but pressed to damp any vibration.
3. On the bow of the kettle with the wood tip of the mallet, and allowed to ring freely.
4. On the bow of the kettle with the wood tip of the mallet, but pressed to damp any ringing.

==== Frame mounted horizontal kettle gongs ====
===== Reyong =====
Also spelled reong, this instrument consists of 12 kettles mounted horizontally in a row on a frame. It is played by four musicians, each taking responsibility for 2 to 4 of its kettles. The players, who sit in a row, are split into two groups, the first consisting of the first and third players in the row, and the second consisting of the second and fourth players. Both people in the same group play the same part, but doubled an octave apart. The parts of group one and of group two, when played together, are interlocking. The reyong has both melodic and non-melodic percussive roles.

===== Trompong =====
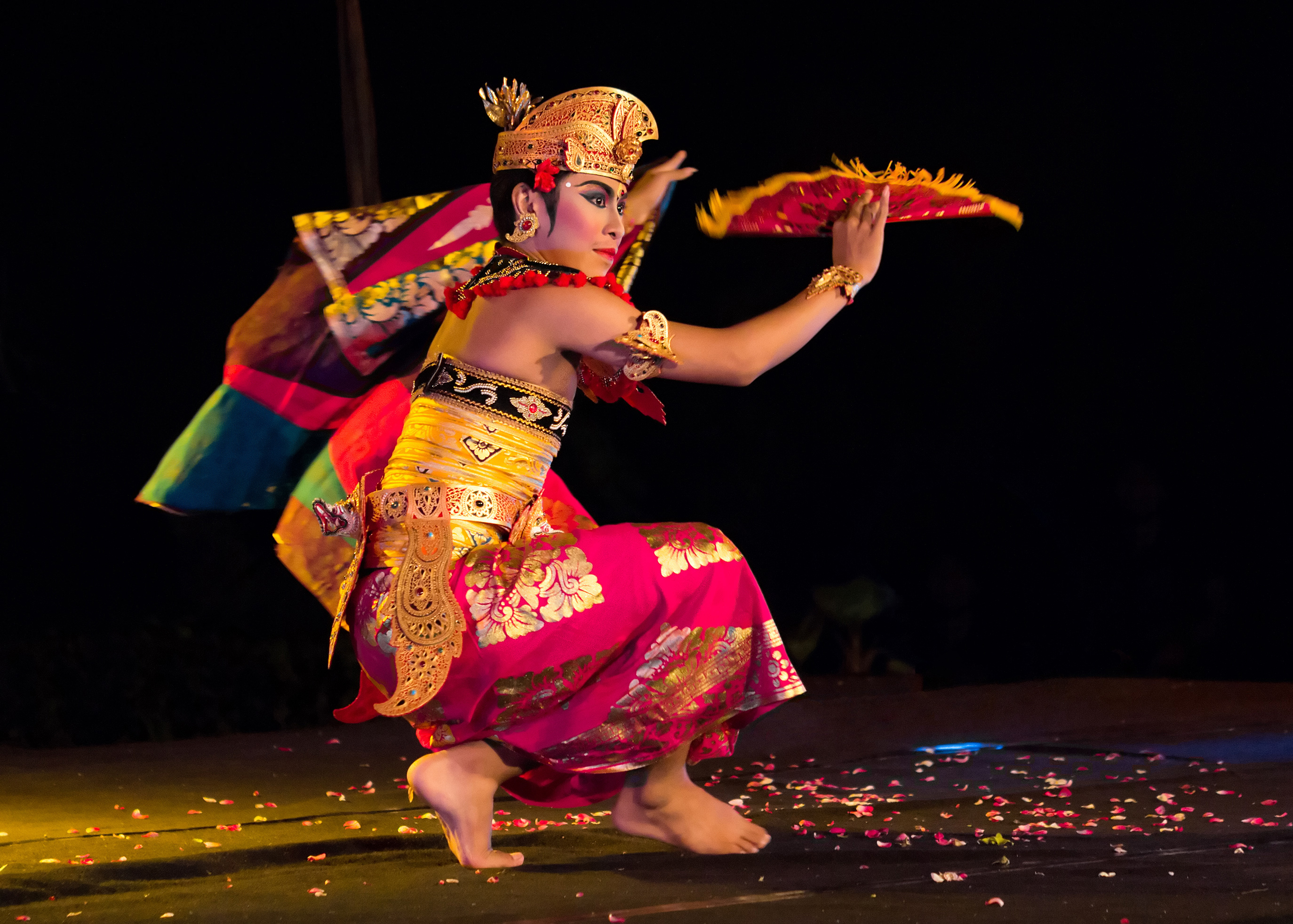
Kebyar duduk dancer

The trompong is not usually used in kebyar, as it is associated with older genres such as gamelan gong gdé. When it is used, however, it is positioned in front of the ensemble, facing the audience. Constructed similarly to reyong, it consists of 10 kettles, with a range of two octaves. It is played by only one person, and that person may be a leader of the ensemble who sits on a short stool, playing the main melodic line. The trompong is also played by a dancer in dance pieces such as Kebyar Trompong and Kebyar duduk. Because of the size of the instrument, the melodies are composed to allow one to slowly shift one's position to reach the extremes of its range.

==== Individual horizontal hand held kettle gongs ====
===== Tawa tawa =====
The tawa tawa is a small kettle held in the lap or arm and struck on the boss by a mallet with a soft round head. It plays the beats of the gong cycle and acts somewhat like a metronome.

===== Kempli or kajar =====
The kempli and kajar are small kettles set over cords strung on a boxlike stand. They are mainly used as tempo keeping instruments. They are usually played with a cord wrapped stick like those of the reyong and trompong. The kettle is struck on the boss while damped with the other hand to produce a sharper, dryer sound.

===== Kelenang =====
Also written klenang, it is a very small kettle, about 5 inches in diameter, either set on its own stand or held in the hands. It, too, is played with a cord wrapped stick. It plays every second beat of the tempo, usually alternating with the kempli or tawa tawa.

===== Kajar =====
The kajar is a small kettle with a recessed boss, held on the lap and played with a hard stick. The kajar plays accents to important parts of the rhythm.

=== Primary rhythm instruments ===
==== Kendang ====
The kendang is a double-headed drum of jackfruit wood and cowhide. The exterior is shaped like a truncated cone while the negative space of the interior is sculpted like an hourglass. This shape and the cinching action of hide straps creates two distinct, approximate tunings in one drum. Like most gamelan instruments, kendang are paired: the larger, lead part female, wadon, and the other male, lanang. The surfaces inside the kendang wadon are carved straighter than those in the lanang, resulting in a more resonant, booming timbre.

Much like the syllables for pitches used for pitched instruments, kendang have a set of onomatopoetic spoken syllables for each stroke producing a total of 14 types of sound. Kendang are played with either bare hands only or bare hands plus one mallet. The kendang wadon player typically tops the hierarchy of the ensemble, setting tempo and aurally cuing transitions like a conductor.

The kendang part is the most complex in gong kebyar, drawing from a rich lexicon of rapid-fire, syncopated patterns to fit the mood and progression of pitched music. The lanang drummer is responsible for filling in an appropriate interlocking part. Kendang players may sit facing the same way, wadon in front and lanang behind.

==== Ceng-ceng ====
Pronounced /t͡ʃeŋ t͡ʃeŋ/, this instrument consists of several small, overlapping cymbals tied to a frame. The frame is often carved to look like an animal, most commonly a turtle, as a mythic turtle is said to carry the island of Bali on its back. The player holds a pair of matching cymbals with bamboo or textile handles, striking the stationary cymbals in quick, even succession or in asymmetrical accents with kendang or reyong.

=== Soft melody instruments ===
==== Suling ====
One of the two instruments able to bend pitch, the suling is a vertical bamboo flute. Suling come in a variety of sizes, from a piccolo-like < 1 ft to a breathy 5 ft. The suling section doubles and ornaments the melody; the highest register suling has the freest rein to improvise. The player circular breathes to allow the pitch to be sustained into a constant tone. A peculiar quality of Balinese suling, distinct from Sundanese suling, is a combined vibrato from irregular flexing of the jaw and working of the tongue.

Suling have retained the complete septatonic tuning of court gamelan and can access tones in the pitch gaps of keyed instruments for effect.

==== Rebab ====
The rebab is a spike fiddle played with a bow. It is only sometimes used in kebyar as it is often drowned out by the metallophones. Its melodic line is similar to the suling, sometimes reaching pitches on a septatonic scale. It has only two strings tuned a Western fourth apart which never touch the unfretted fingerboard. This allows the player to change notes by pressing down on the string, bending the string sideways, sliding, or changing strings.

Unlike a Western string bow, the bow of the rebab is deeper and held underhand like that of a viola da gamba. The player's thumb applies pressure directly on the hairs to control tension.

=== Tuning and gender ===
There is no standard pitch in any Balinese music. Generally speaking, all instruments in a gamelan gong kebyar ensemble are made and tuned at the same time. Each ensemble is tuned to itself, making it nearly impossible to remove an instrument from one ensemble to use it in another and have it match pitch. In any ensemble, however, instruments are gendered, and their individual tuning depends on that instrument's gender.

Almost every instrument in a kebyar ensemble is paired with a male and female counterpart. Each instrument in a pair is tuned differently from its counterpart, one higher and one lower. Played at the same time, the higher instrument (known as pengisep or "inhaler") and the lower instrument (known as the pengumbang or "exhaler"), produce a beating effect (ombak) by sympathetic resonance, creating an overall shimmering, pulsating quality. The female instrument is tuned lower, while the male instrument is tuned higher. For example, one note on a female gangsa pemadé might be tuned to 220 Hz, while the male gangsa pemadé might be tuned slightly higher to 228 Hz. Some kebyar ensembles are tuned so that the numban ensemble is tuned so that the beats are significantly faster for higher frequencies, with the lowest jegog notes nearly a quarter-tone apart. A gendered pair of gangsa will play interlocking kotekan melodies, such that in each pair one interlocking part (polos or sangsih) is on the female and the other on the male instrument. The second pair of that instrument (e.g., pemade) uses the opposite arrangement, so that there is one instrument of each gender playing each part: female polos, male sangsih, female sangsih, and male polos, for full balance.

== Kebyar music ==
=== Kebyar ===
Its namesake refers to the explosive, predominantly unmetered section marking the introduction and some transitions of kebyar compositions. The compositional style derives from kebyar legong of Buleleng, North Bali characterized by long, maximum-volume notes simultaneously struck by the whole ensemble, freely ringing glissandi, dramatic tempo changes, and rhythmic triplets.

=== Tabuh kreasi baru ===
Tabuh kreasi baru ("new compositions") are the primary type of instrumental music in gamelan gong kebyar. Characterized by a succession of passages featuring each instrumental group, they were, "rhapsodic," and, "loosely constructed," at the beginning of the 20th century but became increasingly standardized.

=== Gong cycle ===
The music is divided into 4 beat groups, this whole rhythmic cycle is called the gongan. The gongs divide gongan into sections, gong ageng, the largest gong, marks the end of gongan, the smaller gongs mark the 4th or 8th beat and the smallest gongs outline the pulse.

== See also ==
- Gamelan
- Jegog
- Selunding
