= Deng =

Deng may refer to:

== People and ethnic groups ==
- Deng (Chinese surname), including a list of people with the name
  - Deng Sui, empress dowager of the Eastern Han Dynasty.
  - Deng Xiaoping, leader of China 1978–1989
  - Honghao Deng (born 1994), Chinese computational designer and entrepreneur
- Deng (South Sudanese name), including a list of people with the name
- Deng (ethnic group), of Mishmi people in Tibet

== Other uses ==
- Deng (god), a sky, rain, and fertility god in Dinka mythology
- Deng (state), an ancient Chinese state
- DEng, or Doctor of Engineering degree
- Deng, fictional characters in the Bolo universe

== See also ==
- Denge (disambiguation)
- Daeng (disambiguation)
- Dengue fever
- Dengg
