= Petrus Kaseke =

Indonesian musical instrument maker, music teacher

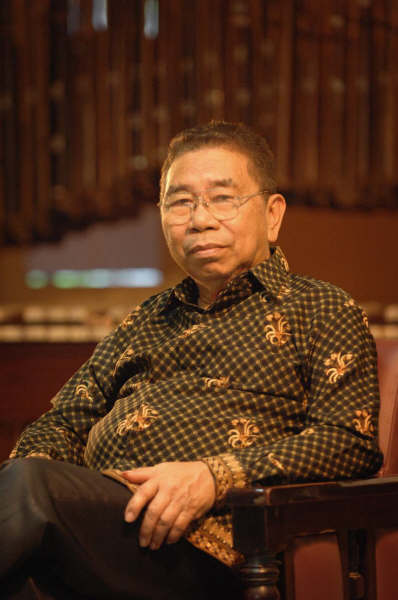
- Petrus Kaseke
- Born: October 2, 1942; Minahasa, North Sulawesi
- Died: August 2022, age 80
- Burial place: Bancaan, Salatiga
- Occupation(s): music teacher, musical-instrument maker, carpenter
- Years active: 1954-2022
- Known for: building kolintang and angklung musical instruments, performing Indonesian traditional music worldwide

Petrus Kaseke (born in Ratahan, Minahasa, North Sulawesi, October 2, 1942) was an Indonesian conservationist of Indonesia kolintang musical instruments.

He was labeled a "pioneer of kolintang" for Java because of his contributions to keeping the kolintang instruments from being lost. As a carpenter, he was able to build instruments; as a teacher, he was able to inspire another generation to learn to play them. His efforts were important, because much of the konlintang-playing community has left their ancestral land, losing contact with community culture. His efforts have led to reconnection, manifesting in an October 2009 concert, in which 1223 musicians came together for a concert, witnessed by the Guinness World Records.

He also made angklungs.

He was honored by the Central Java Provencial Government with a certificate of appreciation for his role as an "Initiator and figure of Kolintang Music Development in the Land of Java." His musical instruments are in use across the Indonesian archipelago and in other countries.

As a musician, he performed internationally in Singapore in 1970, Australia in 1971, the United States in 1973, England in 1973 and Continental Europe (Netherlands in 1972, Germany in 1972 and Switzerland in 1974) and the Nordic countries (Denmark, Norway and Sweden in 1974).

== Manufacturing career ==
Kolintang and angklung

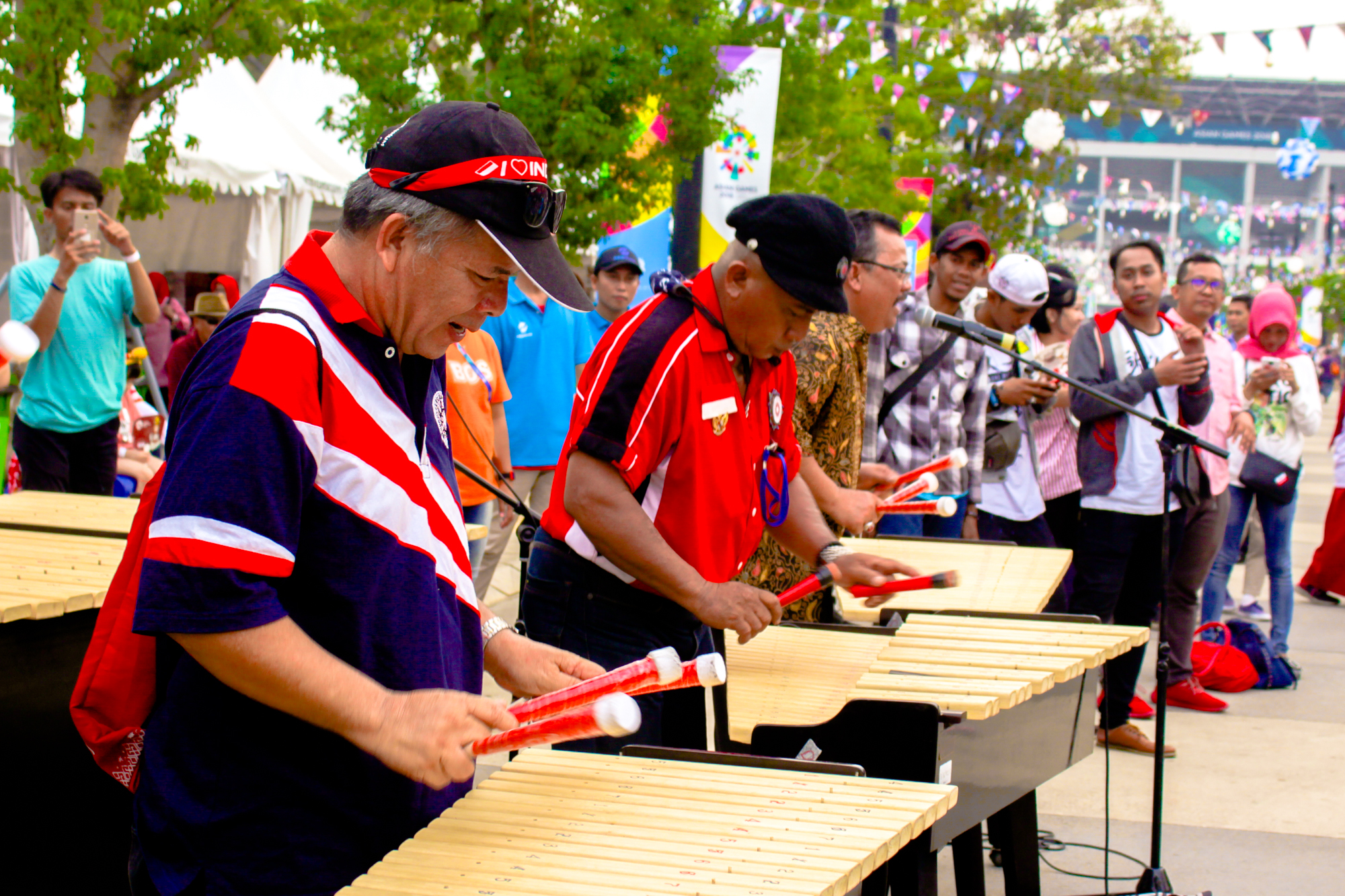
Men playing kolintangs

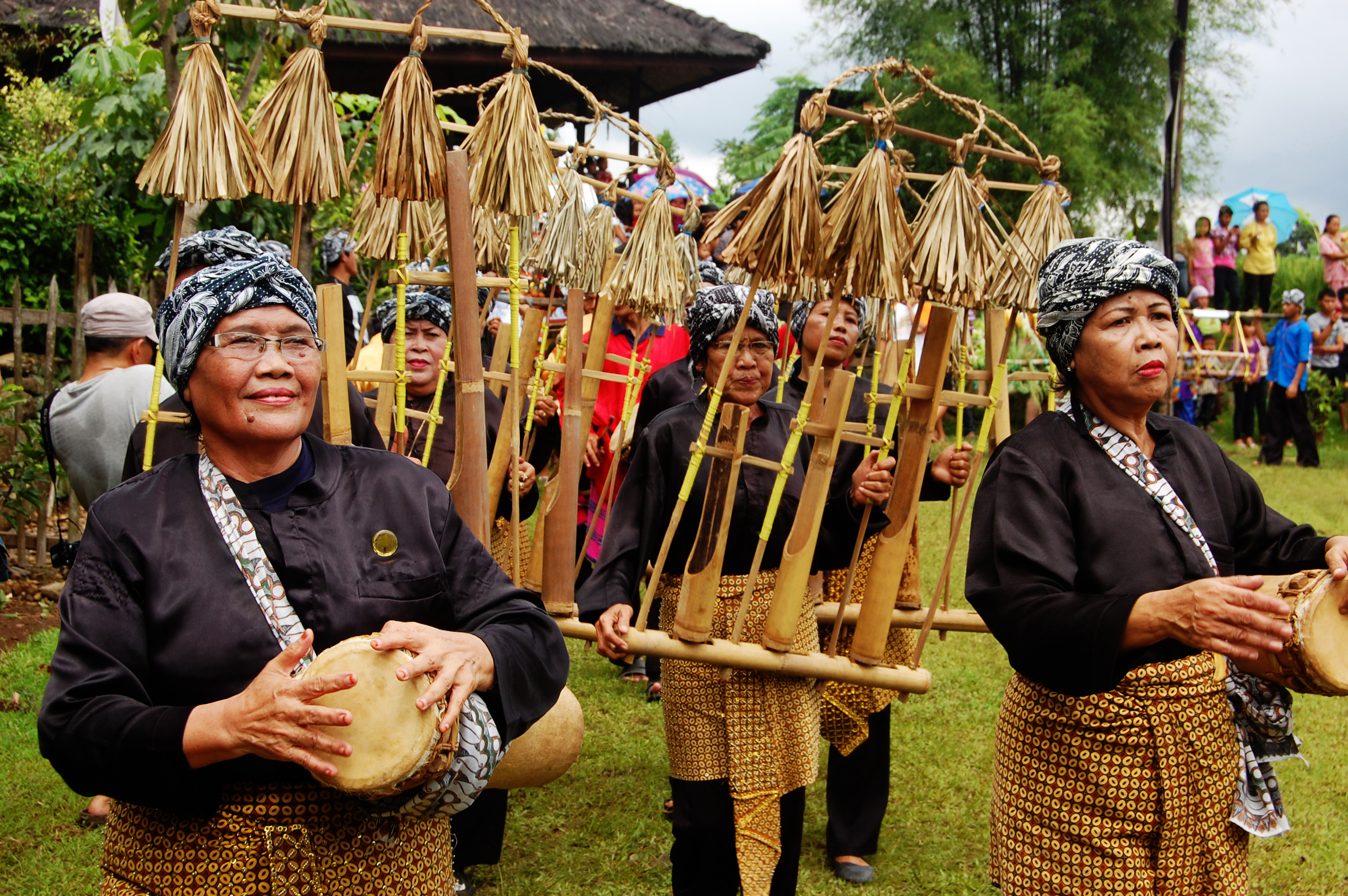
Women with angklungs and drums. No particular connection to Kaseke's community.

In 1954, 10-year old Petrus Kaseke made his first kolintang, an instrument "with two and a half octaves diatonic notes." This was an accomplishment, not only because of his age, but because of the area's history.

The area had been under the control of the Dutch, who banned kolintang music as religiously offensive to their Christian sensitivities; the music was used by the native people in the worship of their ancestral spirits. The pressure to make kolintang a thing of the past continued through World War II.

After the war a blind musician, Nelwan Katuuk, performed with the instrument over the radio on RRI Minahasa. His circa 1952 performance gave energy to reviving the kolintang, bringing the instrument back from extinction.

Petrus Kaseke continued to develop his instrument, until by 1960 he had built an instrument that encompassed three and a half octaves. He won a scholarship from the Regent of Minahasa and attended the Department of Mechanical Engineering, Gadjah Mada University. To supplement his scholarship while attending school, he played kolintang in Yogyakarta.

After earning his bachelor's degree, he used the money he had saved while playing his kolintang to start a business. At the height of his business in the 1990s, he was making as many as 10 sets of kolintangs a month and employing 20 carpenters. His business survived the monetary crisis at the end of the 1990s, shrinking to production of 1-2 sets of kolintangs a month. Many other kolintang manufacturers went bankrupt in this period.

He also put his own touch (or a "Minahasa" touch) on the angklung, a traditional Javan musical instrument. His version, made of three tubes, arranged the three so that the middle tube had the "fundamental tone". In a chord of C, the center tube was the c note, the composition of notes being 5-1-3 or g-c-e. Putting the fundamental tone in the center follows the ancestral concept of Minahasa Toar, which is from the word Tuur or the main stem, the center of balance.

He is also remembered for combining the kolintang and angklung instruments into one musical ensemble, taking the combination on tour.

== Overseas performances ==
In spite of the kolintang being suppressed earlier for religious reasons, the kolintang has found a home in Christian faith; the group which took the kolintang and angklung instruments overseas to Sweden did so as part of the Indonesian Pentecostal Church. Kaseke may have been involved in making the group's instruments, as the article stated, "The instruments they played were made by one of the choir members." The group played both kolintangs and angklungs.

The performance in Australia also featured the kolintangs and angklungs. Kaseke appeared in a photo from that tour, with two children in front of a kolintang.

The group to America included members of members of the university staff of the Christian University of Salatiga, the Pentecostal Church and a bible school.

- 1970 appeared in Singapore for three days.
- 1971 performed in Australia for roughly three months and visited more than 50 cities, including Canberra, with the Indonesian Ambassador to Australia, Sujitno Sukirno.
- In 1972 he performed in several New York and Los Angeles, United States cities.
- In 1973 he appeared in continental Europe, including Switzerland, Germany, Denmark and the Netherlands (with the Indonesian Ambassador to the Netherlands.

== Activities in old age and the end of his life ==
Kaseke ran his kolintang and angklung-making business until he died. His other activities included leading the Angklung Kolintang choir at the Bethany Salatiga church and teaching music at the bible school in Magelang. He continued to play the kolintang and to take his grandchildren to kolintang competitions (virtually during the Covid pandemic).

He had an advisory role at the Pinkan Regional Management Board (National Kolintang Human Association) Central Java, and wrote a textbook, Kolintang Maimo Kumolintang.
