= Daeng =

Daeng may refer to:

- Daeng or Daing, a Malay hereditary title for a Malay Patrilineal Royal descent of Bugis.
- Daeng Parani (died ca. 1726), early 18th-century Bugis warrior prince.
- Daeng Soetigna (1908–1984), Indonesian music teacher and father of modern angklung music
- Daeng (Thai: แดง, lit. 'red'), the Thai name of Xylia xylocarpa, a perennial tree

== See also ==
- Daing
- Deng (disambiguation)
- Dang (disambiguation)
