= Dang =

Dang may refer to:

== Music ==
- "Dang" (song), by Caroline Polachek from Desire, I Want To Turn Into You: Everasking Edition, 2024
- "Dang!" (song), by Mac Miller from The Divine Feminine, 2015
- "Dang!", by GreatGuys from Trigger, 2018
- "Dang", by Rainbow Kitten Surprise, 2025

== People ==
- Dang (surname) with origins in both Asiatic and Indo-European languages
- Dang, a pseudonym of animator Dan Gordon
- Dang Ngoc Long (born 1957), Vietnamese guitarist

== Places ==
=== India ===
- Dang, Uttar Pradesh, a village in Uttar Pradesh
- Dang (Vidhan Sabha constituency), Gujarat
- Dang district, India, a district in Gujarat

=== Iran ===
- Dang, Iran, a village in Fars Province

=== Nepal ===
- Dang District, Nepal, a district in Lumbini Province
- Dang Valley, a valley in western Nepal

== Other ==
- Dang! (TV series), 2026 television series
- Dang, a minced oath for "damnation"
- Đảng, the Communist Party of Vietnam
- Dr. Michael Dang, a villain from the 1986 Indian film Karma

== See also ==
- "Dang Me", a 1964 song by Roger Miller
- Deng (disambiguation)
- Daeng (disambiguation)
