= Kolintang =

Indonesian traditional musical instrument

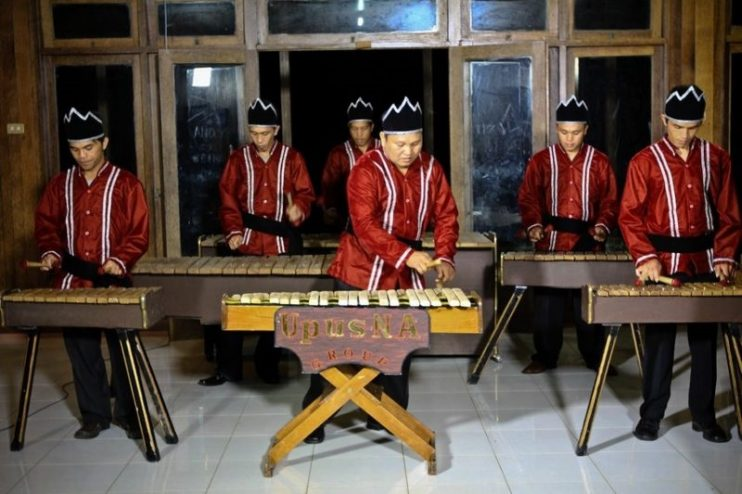
- A kolintang ensemble, a traditional musical instrument from the Minahasa region of North Sulawesi, Indonesia.
- Classification: Percussion instrument
- Developed: Indonesia (North Sulawesi)

Playing range
- Diatonics scales

Cultural practices and expressions linked to Balafon and Kolintang in Mali, Burkina Faso, Côte d'Ivoire and Indonesia
- UNESCO Intangible Cultural Heritage
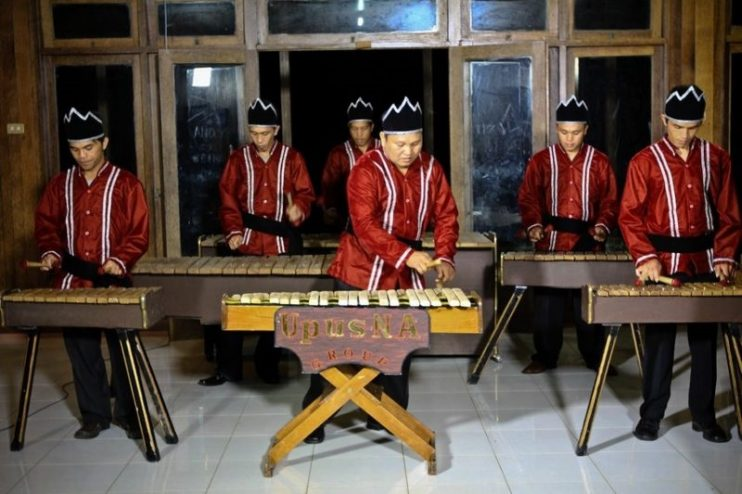
- Kolintang Ensemble
- Country: [[Mali, Burkina Faso, Côte d'Ivoire, Indonesia]]
- Domains: initiation rites, instrument making, intercultural dialogue, life cycle, music education, oral tradition, percussion instruments, religious music, social inclusion, veneration of the dead, work songs
- Reference: 02131
- Region: Asia and the Pacific

Inscription history
- Inscription: 2024 (19th session)
- List: Representative List

Kolintang is a traditional Minahasan percussion instrument from North Sulawesi, Indonesia, consisting of wooden blades arranged in a row and mounted on a wooden tub. Kolintang is usually played in ensemble music. Kolintang in the Minahasan community is used to accompany traditional ceremonies, dance, singing, and music. The wood used to make Kolintang blades is light but strong local wood such as Telur wood, Wenuang wood, Cempaka wood, Waru wood, and the like which have a fiber construction. parallel. Meanwhile, kolintang resonator crates are usually made of hardwood materials such as teak or mahogany.

In 2013, the kolintang musical instrument from the Minahasan, North Sulawesi was recognized as National Intangible Cultural Heritage of Indonesia by the Indonesian Ministry of Education and Culture.

== Etymology ==
The word "kolintang" comes from the Minahasan language. The word comes from the sound "tong" for low notes, "ting" for high notes, and "tang" for middle notes. In the past, the Minahasa people used to invite people to play the instrument by saying "Let's play tong-ting-tang" or in the Minahasan local language "Maimo Kumolintang". Because of that habit emerged the term "kolintang".

== History ==
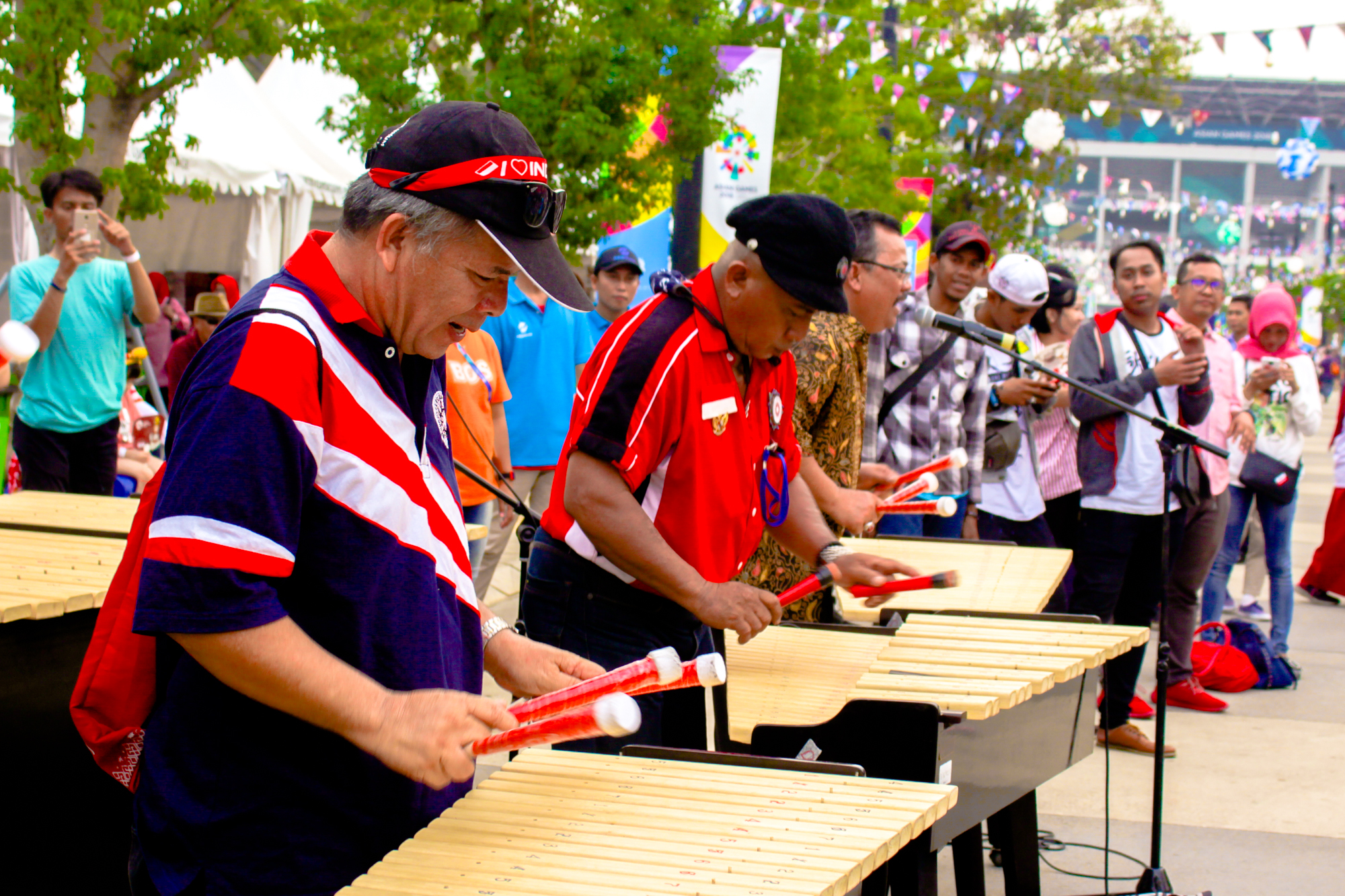
Kolintang ensemble performance.

=== Mythology ===
There is a Minahasan folklore about the origin of the discovery of the kolintang musical instrument. In a village in Minahasa region, there is a girl who is very beautiful and good at singing named Lintang. One day Lintang was proposed by Makasiga a young man and woodcarver. Lintang accepted Makasiga's proposal on one condition that Makasiga had to find a musical instrument that sounded more melodious than a gold flute. Makasiga with wood carving skills managed to find the musical instrument that is the forerunner of kolintang.

=== Origins ===
Initially, the kolintang musical instrument consisted of few pieces of wood placed in a row on top of the players' legs, who were sitting on the ground with both legs straight in front of them. From time to time, the use of player's feet is replaced with two banana sticks. The use of resonator boxes began to be used since the arrival of Prince Diponegoro and his followers who brought gamelan to Minahasa to undergo exile in 1830. The use of kolintang musical instruments is related to traditional beliefs of the Minahasa people, such as in ceremonies for worshiping ancestral spirits.

Along with the arrival of Christianity to the Minahasa land, rituals of worship of animism and dynamism began to be abandoned. Kolintang reappeared by a blind man named Nelwan Katuuk who composed kolintang notes according to diatonic scales and was introduced again in 1940. Kolintang only consists of one melody consisting of diatonic tones, with a distance of two octaves. As an accompaniment, stringed musical instruments such as guitar, ukulele, and bass are used.

=== Development ===
Kolintang develops continuously. In 1954, kolintang already has a pitch of two and a half octaves and still has a diatonic tone composition. In 1960, it grew again until it reached three and a half octaves with notes of 1 sharp, naturel, and 1 mole. The basic tone is still limited to three keys (naturel, 1 mole, and 1 crus), the pitch has expanded to four and a half octaves from F to C. The development of the kolintang musical instrument is still ongoing, both in terms of the quality of the instrument, the expansion of the pitch range, and the shape of the resonator box.

== Instruments ==
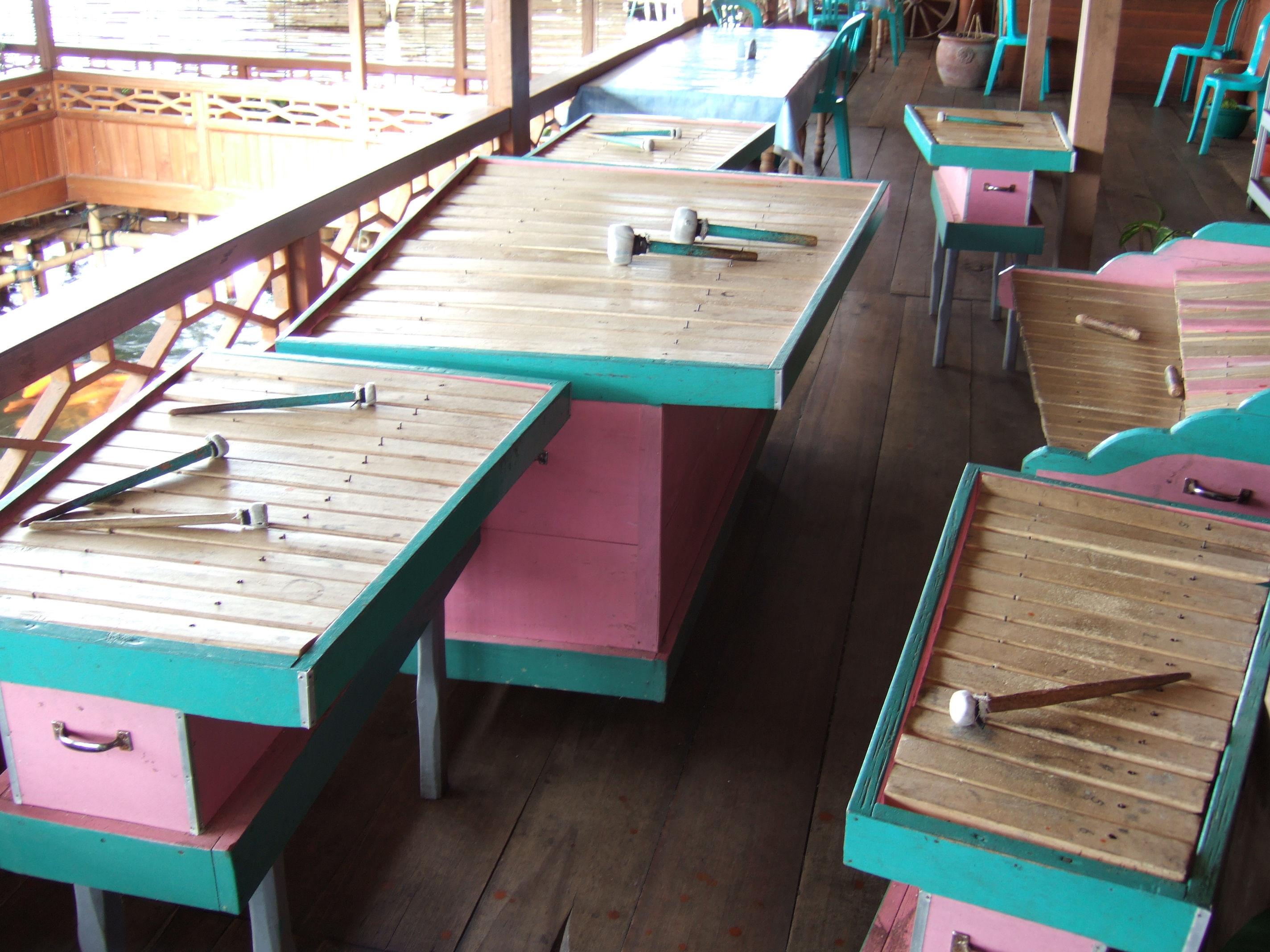
Various kolintang instruments in an ensemble.

As a musical instrument, kolintang is developed. At first only melodic kolintang instruments. Currently complete kolintang has up to ten instruments:

- melody 1 (ina esa)
- melody 2 (ina rua)
- melody 3 (ina taweng)
- cello (cella)
- bass (loway)
- tenor 1 (karua)
- tenor 2 (karua rua)
- alto 1 (uner)
- alto 2 (uner rua)
- alto 3 (katelu).

== Notations ==
The notations system used on the kolintang musical instrument is the diatonic scale. The diatonic scale is a scale consisting of 7 notes, the notes are Do, Re, Mi, Fa, Sol, La, Si, which have a distance of one and a half notes. This scale is divided into two groups, namely the major diatonic and minor diatonic scales. As for the kolintang musical instrument, the chord arrangement is the same as the chord system used on piano and guitar.

== Association ==
National Kolintang Association of Indonesia (Persatuan Insan Kolintang Nasional (PINKAN) Indonesia) is a kulintang association in Indonesia that encourages the improvement of the quality of Kolintang Musical Ensemble artworks in line with the increasing public appreciation of the Kolintang art. PINKAN Indonesia organizes events both independently and in collaboration with the 4 main pillars, they are coaches, craftsmen, players, and kolintang conservationists.

== Gallery ==
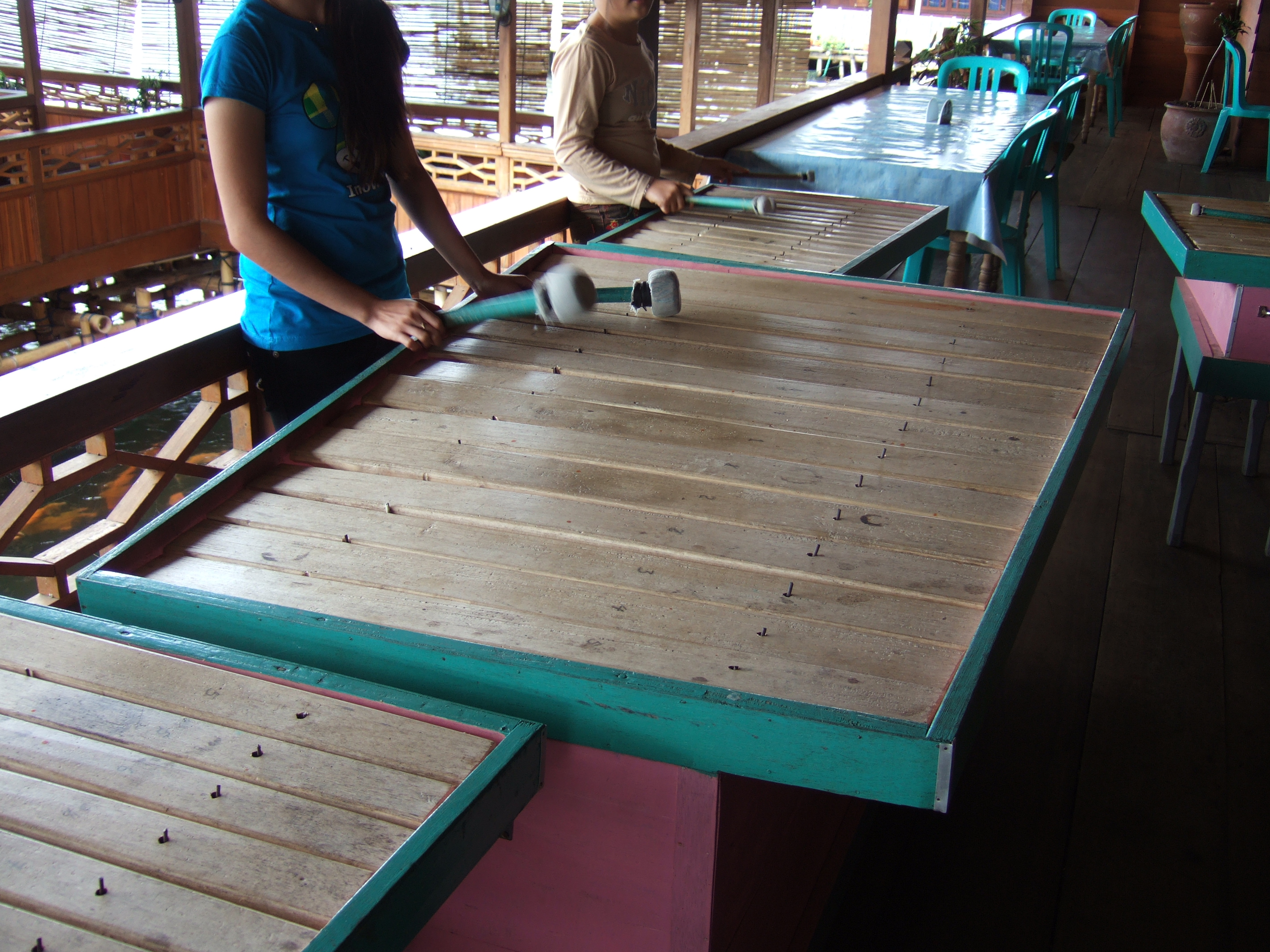
Playing Kolintang in North Sulawesi, Indonesia.

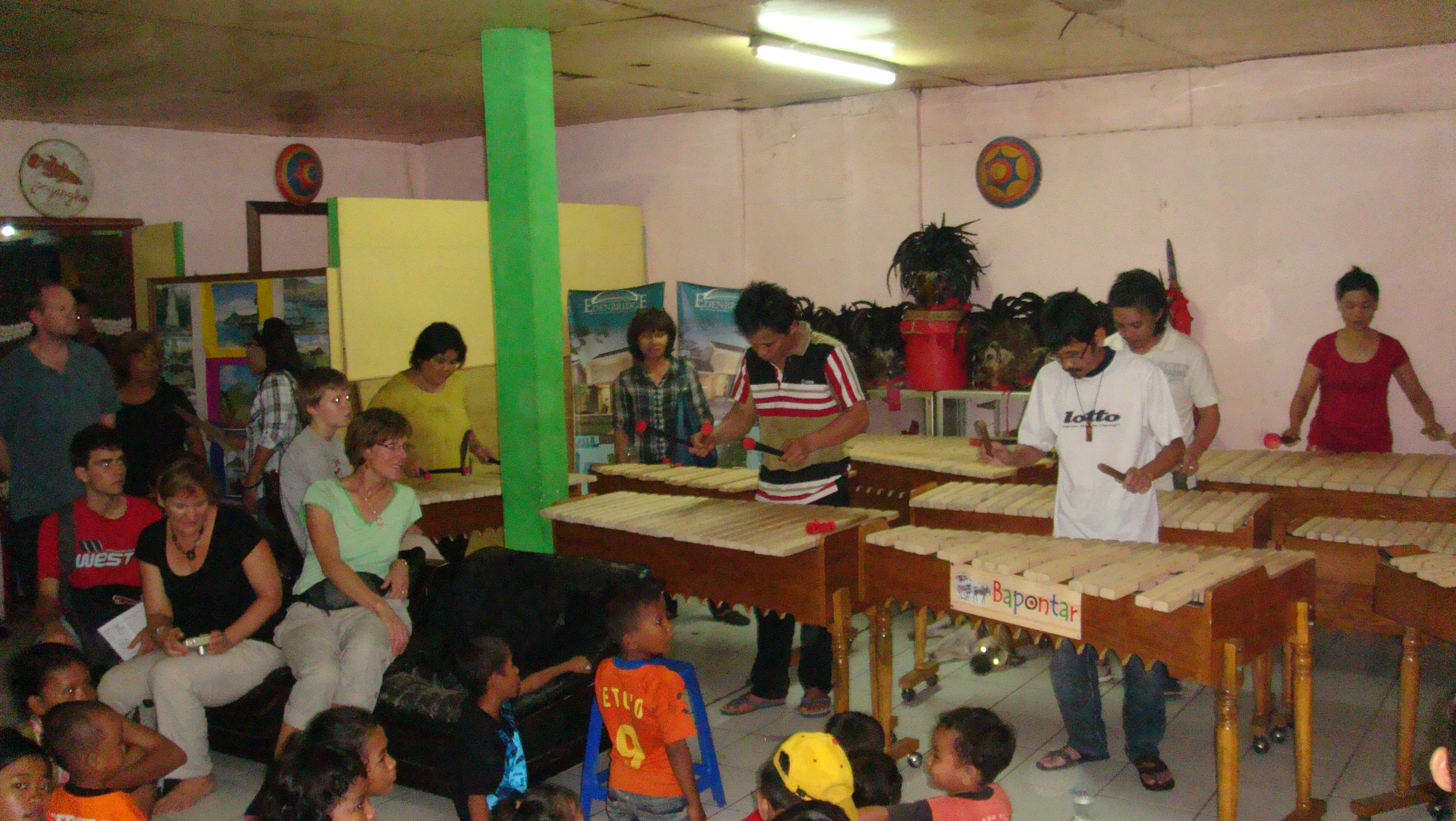
Kolintang ensemble

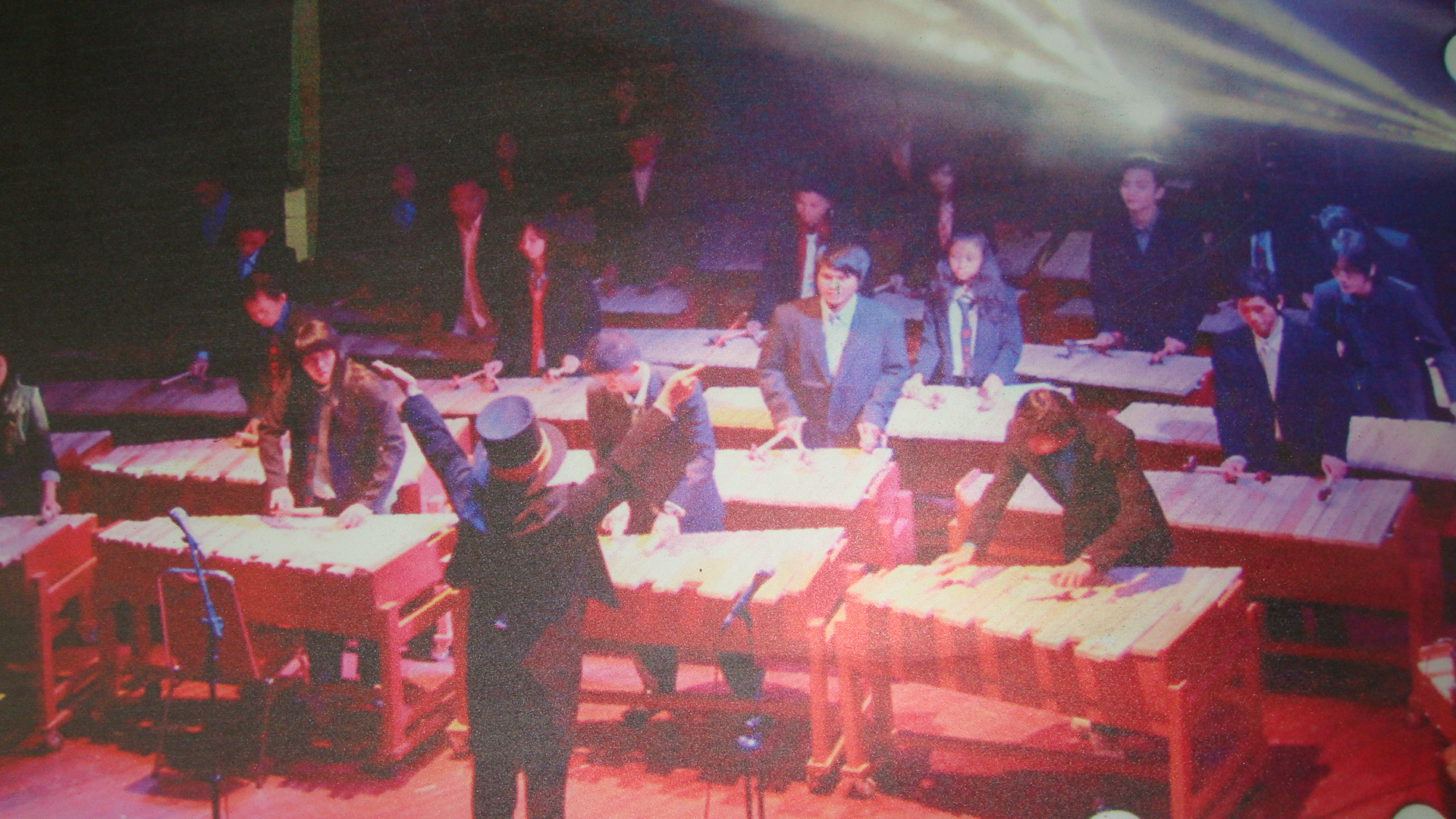
Kolintang performance in Gedung kesenian Jakarta, Indonesia.
