= Denge =

Denge may refer to:

- Denge Marsh, an area in Kent, England
- RAF Denge, a former military site near Dungeness in Kent, England
- Denge Wood, a wood near Canterbury in Kent, England
- Ayanda Denge, South African trans woman and activist

== See also ==
- Deng (disambiguation)
- Dengie, a village in Essex
- Dengue fever
