= Daeng Soetigna =

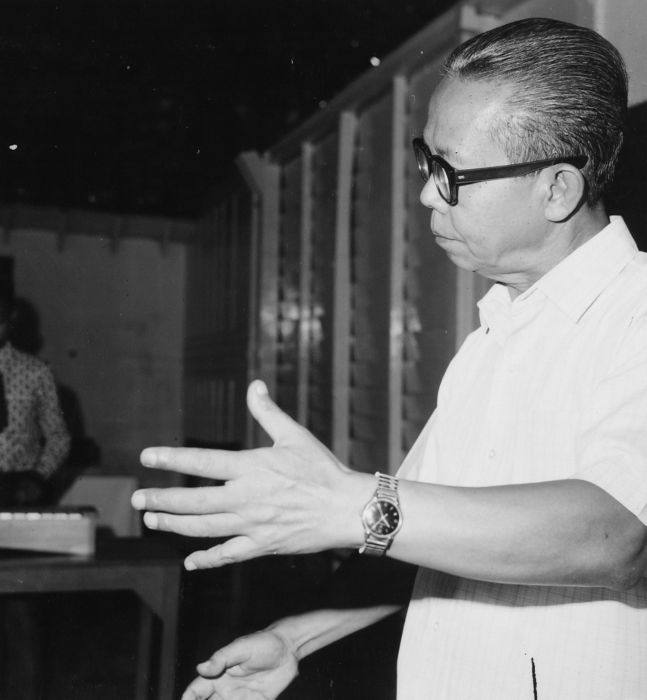
- Daeng Soetigna (1971)
- Born: May 13, 1908; Garut, Dutch East Indies
- Died: April 8, 1984 (aged 75); Bandung, Indonesia
- Occupations: Musician, angklung player
- Known for: Creator of diatonic angklung

Daeng Soetigna (May 13, 1908 – April 8, 1984) was a famous music teacher who is considered the father of modern angklung music. He redesigned the ancient Indonesian instrument, enabling it to play international music. He was also active in staging angklung orchestras in various regions in Indonesia.

== Tribute ==
On May 13, 2016, Google celebrated his 108th birthday with a Google Doodle.
