= Dengg =

Dengg is a surname. Notable people with the surname include:

- Franz Dengg (1928–2024), German ski jumper
- Günther Dengg (born 1973), Austrian biathlete
