= Honghao Deng =

Chinese computational designer

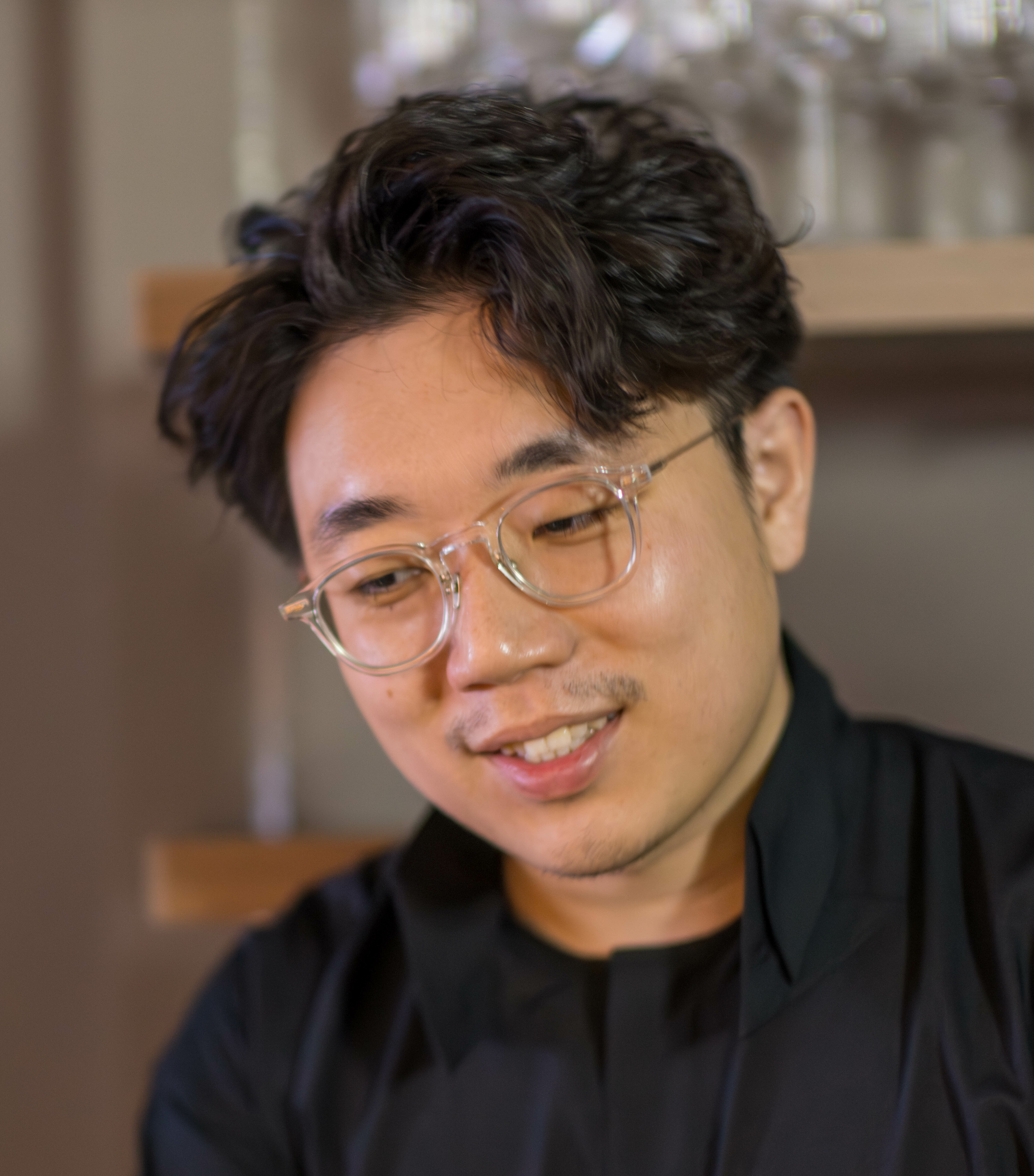
- Deng in 2023
- Born: October 16, 1994 (age 32); Jiangxi, China
- Education: Harvard University - Master's degree
- Occupation: Computational designer
- Website: honghao.gallery

Honghao Deng (Chinese: 邓鸿浩) is a Chinese computational designer and entrepreneur who resides in San Francisco. He is co-founder and CEO of Butlr Technologies and formerly was a researcher at City Science Group, MIT Media Lab.

== Education ==
He earned a Master of Design Technology with Distinction at Harvard University.

== Career ==
Deng founded Butlr Technologies along with Jiani Zeng in 2019. Prior to that he was a researcher at City Science Group, MIT Media Lab. In 2020, his project with Jiani Zeng, Illusory Material: 3D Printed Optical Textiles was selected "The best experimental design project of 2020" by Fast Company and won the 2020 Red Dot: Best of the Best, selected from 4170 entries from 52 countries.

The same project was also featured by Dezeen as a notable example of 3D-printed design in 2020 and was selected as The Best Inventions of 2021 by Time Magazine.

During COVID-19 pandemic, Honghao led his team at Butlr to develop sensors to help combat the disease. These sensors are ceiling-mounted to detect body heat and track people's movements indoors. They are thought to help business understand how clients navigate their stores. As of February 2025, Butlr had sold more than 20,000 of it sensors.

In 2021, Wallpaper magazine recognized Honghao Deng as a "Next Generation" talent for his development of "Illusory Material," a 3D-printing framework that uses a multi-layered voxel system to create dynamic optical effects in physical objects.

In 2022, he was named to the Forbes 30-under-30 list.

In 2024, he was interviewed by NYSE.

== Publications ==
- 2021 - Lenticular Objects: 3D Printed Objects with Lenticular Lens Surfaces That Can Change their Appearance Depending on the Viewpoint
- 2019 - Diffusive Geometries: Vapor as a Tectonic Element to Sculpt Microclimates in Architectural Space.
- 2019 - Hypercept: Speculating the Visual World Intervened by Digital Media.
- 2018 - Twinkle: A Flying Lighting Companion for Urban Safety.
- 2018 - Transvision: exploring the state of the visual field in the age of extreme augmentation.
- 2017 - CatEscape: An Asymmetrical Multiplatform Game Connecting Virtual, Augmented and Physical World.
- 2017 - MagicTorch: A Context-aware Projection System for Asymmetrical VR Games.
