= Angklung =

Sundanese musical instrument made of bamboo

Angklung ᮃᮀᮊᮣᮥᮀ
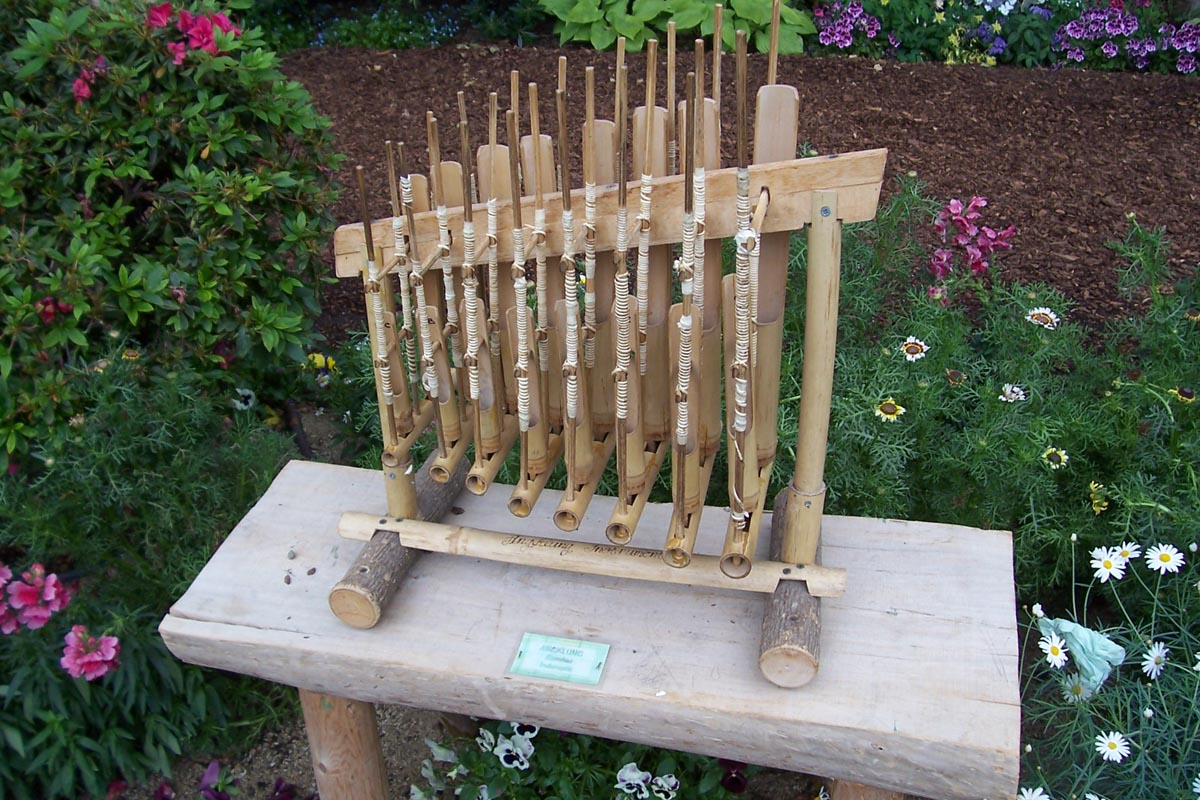
- Angklung with eight pitches

Percussion instrument
- Classification: Idiophone
- Hornbostel–Sachs classification: 111.232 (Sets of percussion tubes)
- Developed: Indonesia

Playing range
- G2 - C6 medium

Indonesian Angklung
- UNESCO Intangible Cultural Heritage
- Country: Indonesia
- Reference: 00393
- Region: Asia and the Pacific

Inscription history
- Inscription: 2010 (5th session)
- List: Representative
- Traditional Angklung (Pentatonic – Slendro Scale: Angklung Kanekes, Angklung Dogdog Lojor, Angklung Gabrag, Angklung Badeng, Angklung Bungko, Angklung Badud, Angklung Buncis, and angklung Calung) and Modern Angklung (Diatonic/Chromatic – Slendro, Pelog, and Madenda Scale: Angklung Padaeng)

The angklung (Sundanese: ᮃᮀᮊᮣᮥᮀ) is a musical instrument from the Sundanese in Indonesia that is made of a varying number of bamboo tubes attached to a bamboo frame. The tubes are carved to produce a resonant pitch when struck and are tuned to octaves, similar to Western handbells. The base of the frame is held in one hand, while the other hand shakes the instrument, causing a repeating note to sound. Each performer in an angklung ensemble is typically responsible for just one pitch, sounding their individual angklung at the appropriate times to produce complete melodies (see Kotekan).

Angklung

The angklung originated in what is now West Java and Banten provinces in Indonesia, and has been played by the Sundanese for many centuries. The angklung and its music have become an important part of the cultural identity of Sundanese communities. Playing the angklung as an orchestra requires cooperation and coordination, and is believed to promote the values of teamwork, mutual respect and social harmony.

On 18 November 2010, UNESCO included the Indonesian angklung in the Representative List of the Intangible Cultural Heritage of Humanity, and encouraged the Indonesian people and the Indonesian government to safeguard, transmit, promote performances and to encourage the craftsmanship of the angklung.

== Etymology ==
The word angklung may have originated from Sundanese angkleung-angkleungan, suggesting the movement of the angklung player and the onomatopoeic klung sound that comes from the instrument.

== History ==
According to Dr. Groneman, the angklung had already been a favorite musical instrument of the entire archipelago even before the Hindu era. According to Jaap Kunst in Music in Java, besides West Java, angklung also exists in South Sumatra and Kalimantan. Lampung, East Java and Central Java are also familiar with the instrument.

In the Hindu period and the time of the Kingdom of Sunda, the instrument played an important role in ceremonies. The angklung was played to honor Dewi Sri, the goddess of Rice, so she would bless their land and lives. The angklung also signaled the time for prayers, and was said to have been played since the 7th century in the Kingdom of Sunda. In the Kingdom of Sunda, it provided martial music during the Battle of Bubat, as told in the Kidung Sunda. The oldest surviving angklung is the Angklung Gubrag, made in the 17th century in Jasinga, Bogor. Other antique angklung are stored in the Sri Baduga Museum, Bandung. The oldest angklung tradition is called angklung buhun ("ancient angklung") from Lebak Regency, Banten. The angklung buhun is an ancient type of angklung played by Baduy people of the inland Banten province during the seren taun harvest ceremony.

In 1938, Daeng Soetigna (Sutigna), from Bandung, created an angklung that is based on the diatonic scale instead of the traditional pélog or sléndro scales. Since then, the angklung has returned to popularity and is used for education and entertainment, and may even accompany Western instruments in an orchestra. One of the first performances of angklung in an orchestra was in 1955 during the Bandung Conference. In 1966 Udjo Ngalagena, a student of Daeng Soetigna, opened his Saung Angklung ("House of Angklung") as a centre for its preservation and development.

UNESCO included the Indonesian angklung in the Representative List of the Intangible Cultural Heritage of Humanity on 18 November 2010.

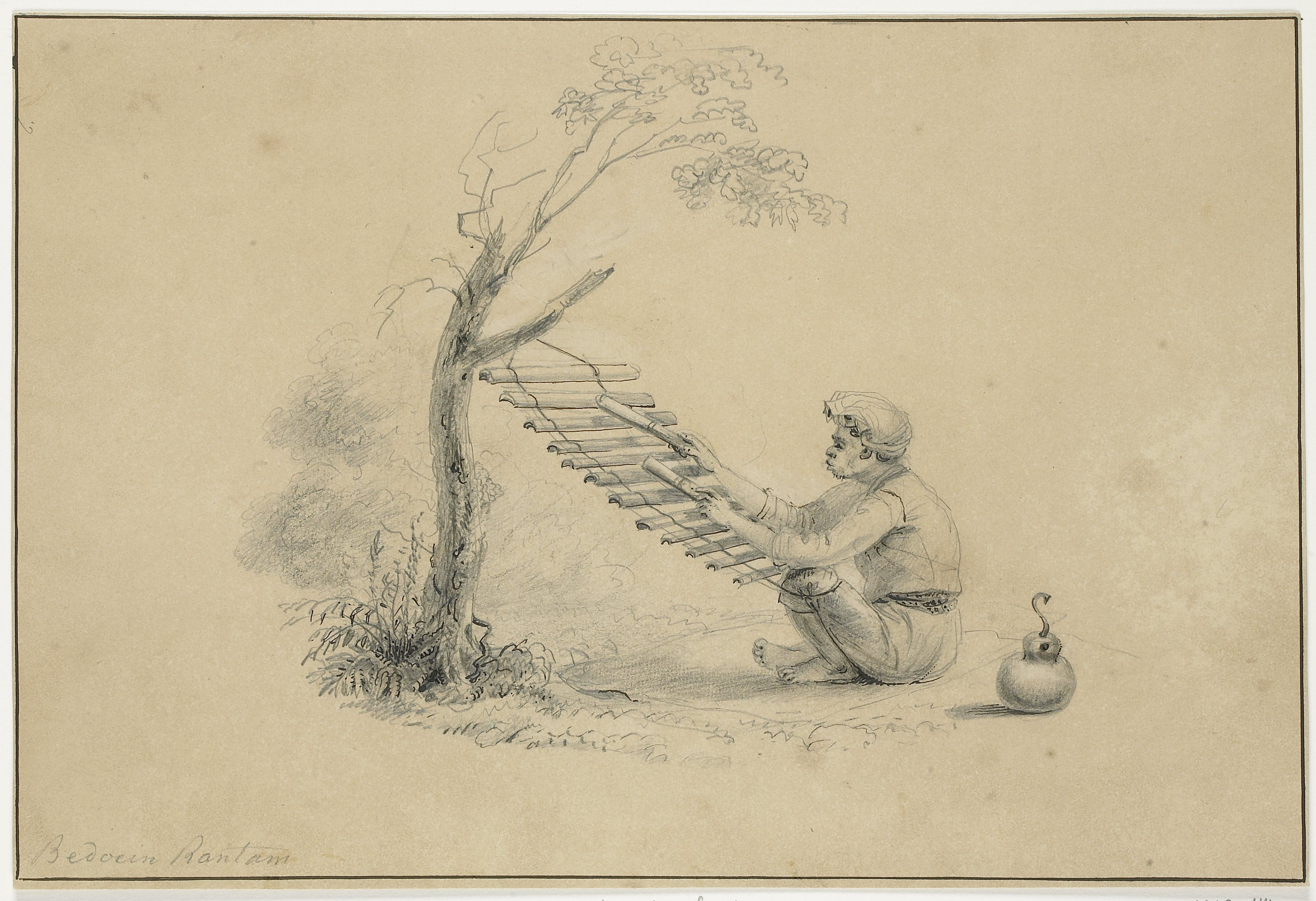
An illustration of a Baduy man playing a calung by Jannes Theodorus Bik, c. 1816–1846.

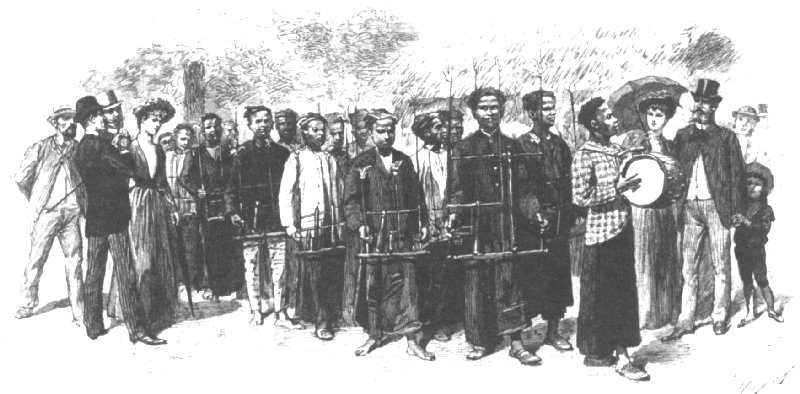
Angklung players in West Java by French illustrator Émile Bayard (1837–1891).

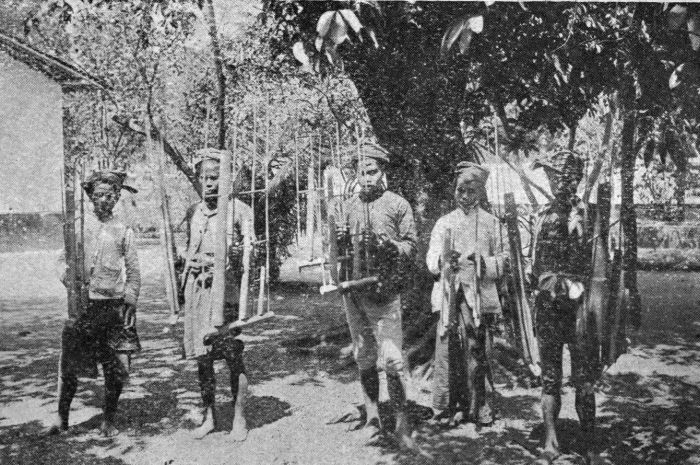
Angklung players in Garut, West Java, before 1904

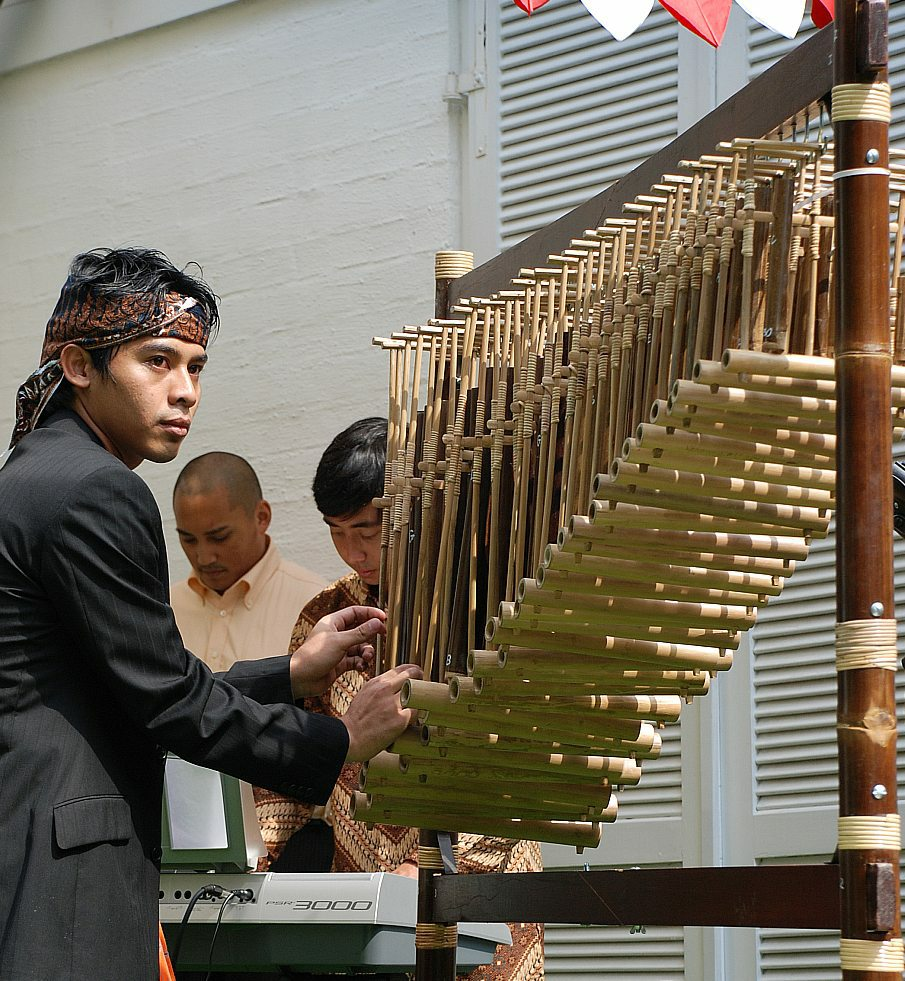
Angklung is an intangible cultural heritage element

== Varieties ==
=== Traditional Angklung ===
==== Angklung kanekes ====
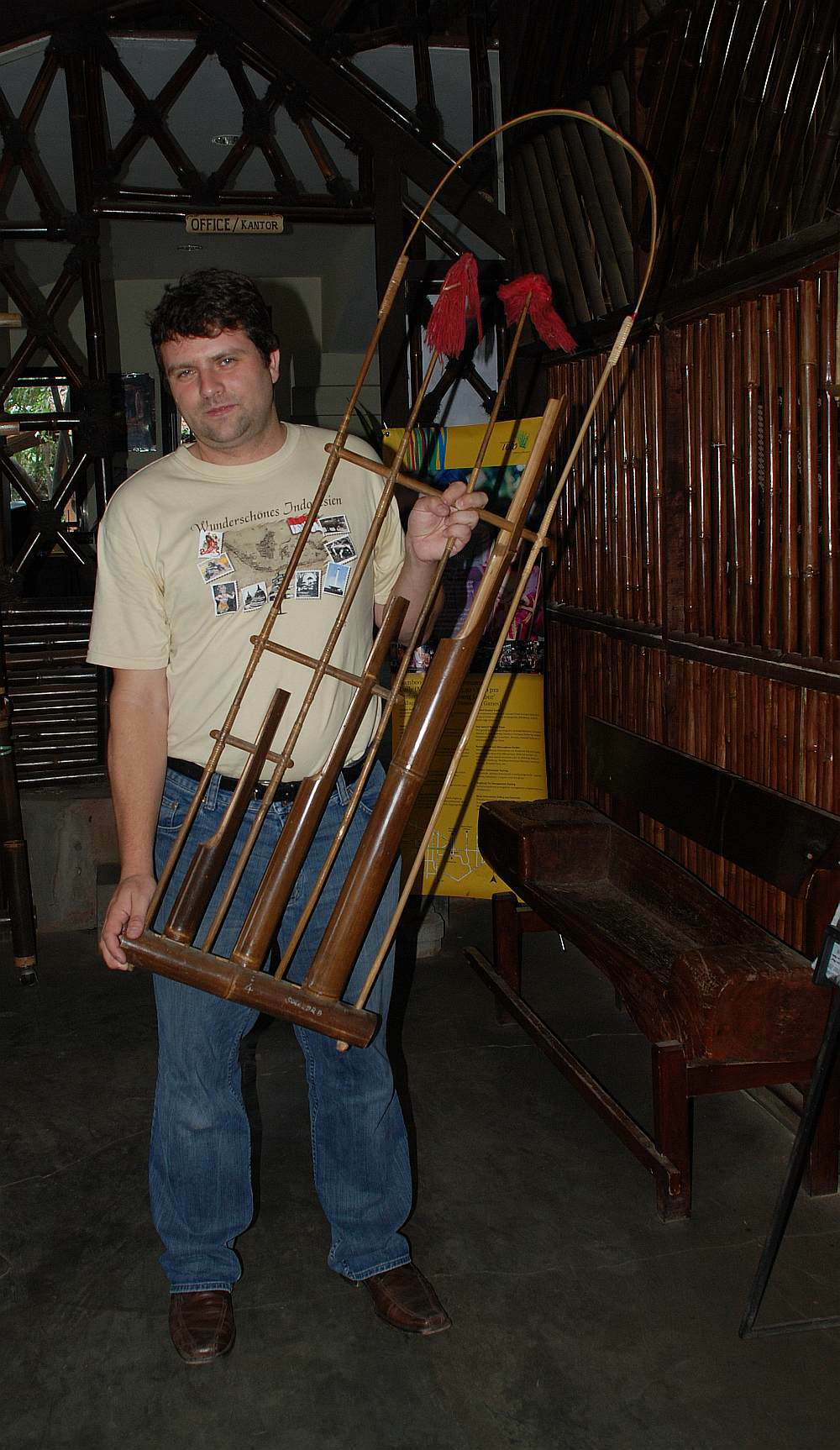
Angklung kanekes or Angklung Buhun or Angklung Baduy, Banten

Angklung kanekes or Angklung buhun or Angklung baduy is an ancient angklung originating from the Baduy in Lebak, the Banten province of Indonesia. This angklung is used to accompany the ritual of planting rice on the fields passed down by their ancestors. Angklung kanekes are only made by the Baduy Dalam tribe who still maintain the pure traditions of their ancestors. The names of angklung instruments in Kanekes from the biggest are: indung, ringkung, dongdong, gunjing, engklok, indung leutik, torolok, and roel.

==== Angklung dogdog lojor ====
Angklung dogdog lojor is an angklung that originates from the Dogdog Lojor culture found in the Kasepuhan Pancer Pangawinan community or Kesatuan Banten Kidul scattered around Mount Halimun. Angklung dogdog lojor is used to accompany the tradition of farming, circumcision, and marriage. This angklung is played by six players consisting of two players playing the angklung dogdog lojor and four players playing the large angklung.

==== Angklung gabrag ====
Angklung gabrag is an angklung originating from Cipinang village, Cigudeg, Bogor, West Java. This angklung is very old and is used to honor the goddess of rice, Dewi Sri. Angklung is played during melak pare (rice planting), ngunjal pare (transporting rice), and ngadiukeun (storage) in the leuit (barn). According to legend, gubrag angklung began to exist when Cipining village experienced a dry season because Dewi Sri did not make it rain.

==== Angklung badeng ====
Angklung badeng is an angklung originating from Garut, West Java. Initially, this angklung was used for the ritual of planting rice, but now it has shifted to be used to accompany the preaching of Islam. It takes nine angklung to complete the da'wah accompaniment process consisting of two angklung roel, one angklung kecer, four angklung indung, two angklung anak, two angklung dogdogs, and two gembyung.

==== Angklung bungko ====
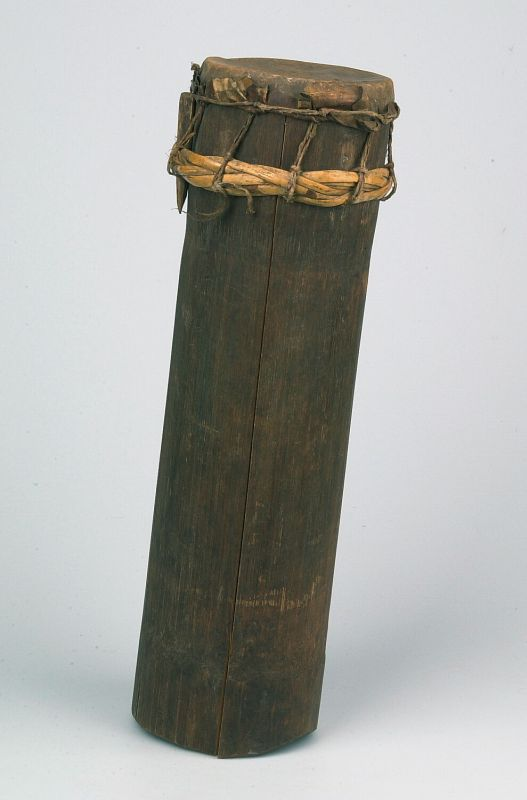
Angklung Dogdog Lojor.

Angklung bungko is an angklung that originates in Bungko village, Cirebon, West Java. Angklung Bungko is played with other musical instruments such as kendang, tutukan, klenong and gongs. In ancient times, angklung bungko was a musical accompaniment to fights between villagers. The existing angklung bungko consists of three pieces which are believed to be 600 years old. This old angklung is believed to have originated from Ki Gede Bungko, the elder of Bungko village, as well as the Commander of the Navy of the Cirebon Sultanate in the Sunan Gunung Jati era around the 15th century. This angklung cannot be played anymore because it is fragile. The people believe that angklung bungko has magical powers. In ancient times, if a child was sick, when the angklung bungko was played around the village and accompanied by a dance, the child could recover on their own.

==== Angklung badud ====
Angklung badud is a type of angklung that is used for performing arts at parades or carnivals. The art of badud angklung was born and preserved in Parakanhonje Village, Indihiang District, Tasikmalaya City, West Java. Under the care of the Kanca Indihiang Big Family, angklung badud in its era around the 70s can be known everywhere. The main function of angklung badud in society is to entertain children before the circumcision ritual. Before the invention of local anesthetics, a child who was going to be circumcised early in the morning would be paraded to the pool (balong) to soak in it. Angklung badud would be played on the way to and from the pool as the people watched, similar to a parade.

==== Angklung buncis ====
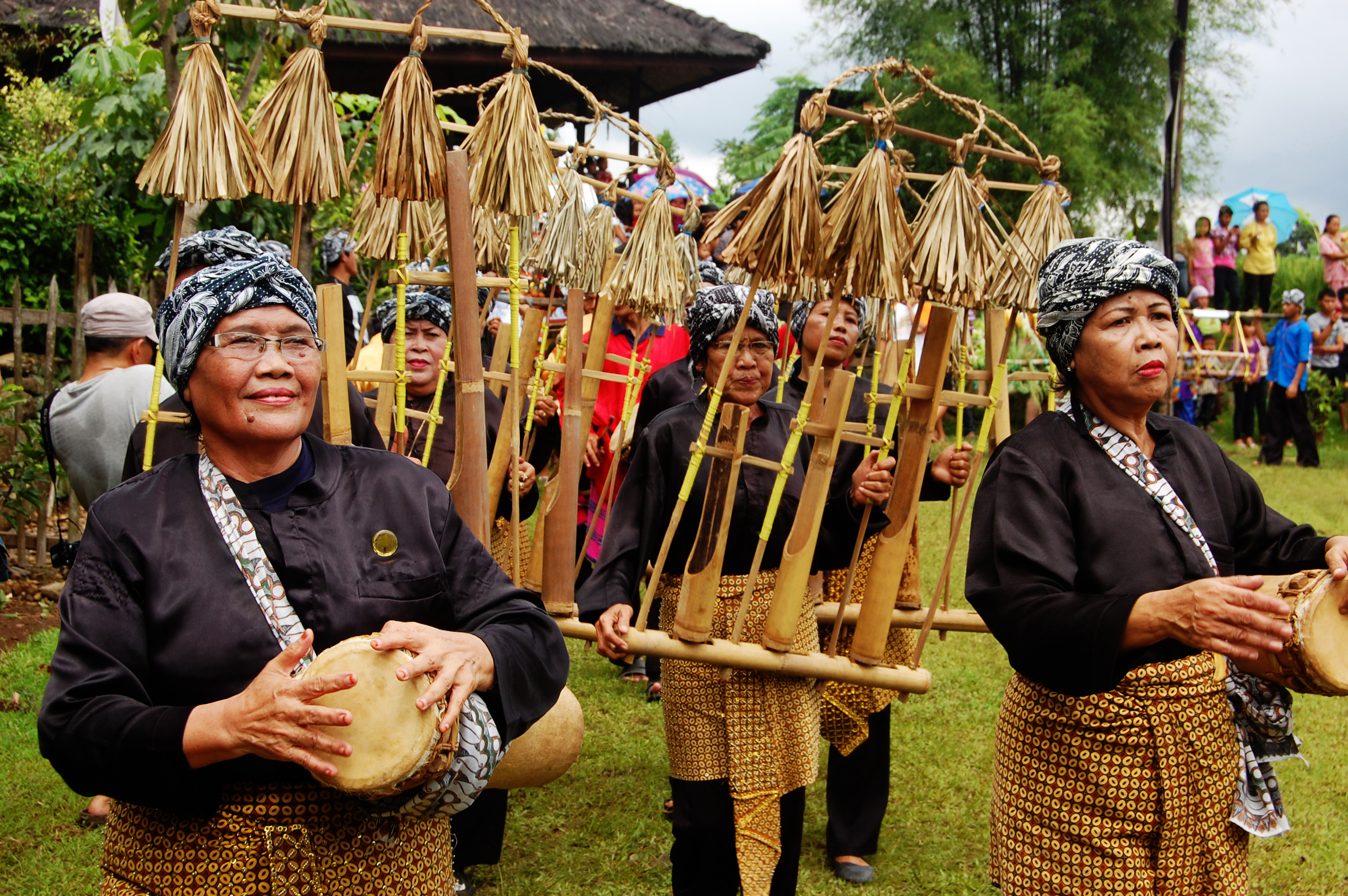
Angklung Buncis in Seren taun ceremony in Bogor, West Java.

Angklung buncis is an angklung used for entertainment, such as the angklung in the Baros area, Arjasari, Bandung, West Java. The instruments used in the art of angklung buncis are two angklung indung, two angklung ambrug, angklung panempas, two angklung pancer, one angklung enclok, three dogdogs (one talingtit, one panunggung, and one badublag). Tarompet, kecrek, and gongs have been added over time. The angklung buncis has a salendro tone and a vocal song can be madenda or degung.

Initially, angklung buncis was used in agricultural events related to rice. Nowadays, angklung buncis is used as entertainment. This is related to societal changes and less emphasis on traditional beliefs. The 1940s can be considered the end of the ritual function of angklung buncis in honor of rice because it has since turned into an entertainment form. In addition, rice storage barns (leuit) began to disappear from people's homes, replaced by sack places that were more practical and easy to carry. Many of the rice is now sold directly, not stored in barns. Thus the art of angklung buncis that was used for the ngunjal (rice-carrying) ritual is no longer needed. The name of the angklung buncis is related to the well-known lyrics "cis kacang buncis nyengcle...". The text is part of the art of angklung buncis, so this art form is called buncis.

==== Angklung calung ====
Angklung calung or calung is a prototype musical instrument made of bamboo. In contrast to the angklung which is played by shaking, the calung is played by hitting the rods (wilahan, bilah) of sections of bamboo tubes arranged according to titi laras (pentatonic scales), da-mi-na-ti-la. Most commonly calung are made from awi wulung (black bamboo), but some are made from awi temen (white bamboo).

The meaning of calung, apart from being a musical instrument, is also attached to the term performance art. There are two known forms of calung Sunda, namely calung rantay and calung jinjing. This musical instrument is a traditional Sundanese musical instrument, which is also known and developed in the Banyumas region. When playing the calung rantay, the player usually plays by sitting cross-legged, while a person playing calung jinjing carries the bamboo that has been lined up and plays it while standing. Initially, calung was performed to accompany Sundanese traditional ceremonies as a ritual for the celebration of the people of West Java, but with the development of the calung era, it began to be used as a musical instrument for entertainment.

==== Angklung Reog ====
Angklung Reog is a musical instrument to accompany the Reog Ponorogo Dance in East Java. Angklung Reog has a loud sound, two tones and a curved rattan shape (unlike the usual cube-shaped angklung), decorated with colored fringed threads. It is said that angklung was a weapon from the kingdom of Bantarangin against the kingdom of Lodaya in the 11th century, when the victory by the kingdom of Bantarangin was happy, the soldiers were no exception, the angklung holder was no exception, because of the extraordinary strength of the reinforcement of the rope, it loosened to produce a distinctive sound, namely klong-klok. and klung-kluk when heard will feel spiritual vibrations.

==== Angklung Reog Gong Gumbeng ====
Is a type of Angklung Reog from Sambit, Ponorogo. Shaped like Angklung Reyog but arranged from small to the largest angklung with various tones, Gong Gumbeng Angklung is the first and oldest type of pitched angklung. A set of angklung Gong Gumbeng that is more than 250 years old is now stored in the Sri Baduga Bandung Museum.

==== Angklung Bali ====
Balinese angklung called Rindik has a distinctive Balinese shape and tone. The angklung Rindik is played by hitting the bamboo like a gamelan. Rindik Bali was originally Angklung Reog from Ponorogo who was brought by later Majapahit officials.

=== Modern angklung or Angklung padaeng ===
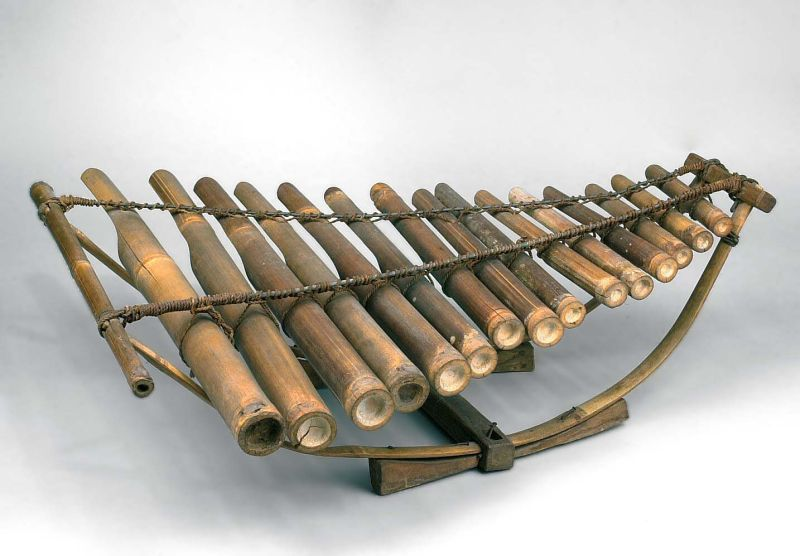
Calung rantai, West Java, before 1936.

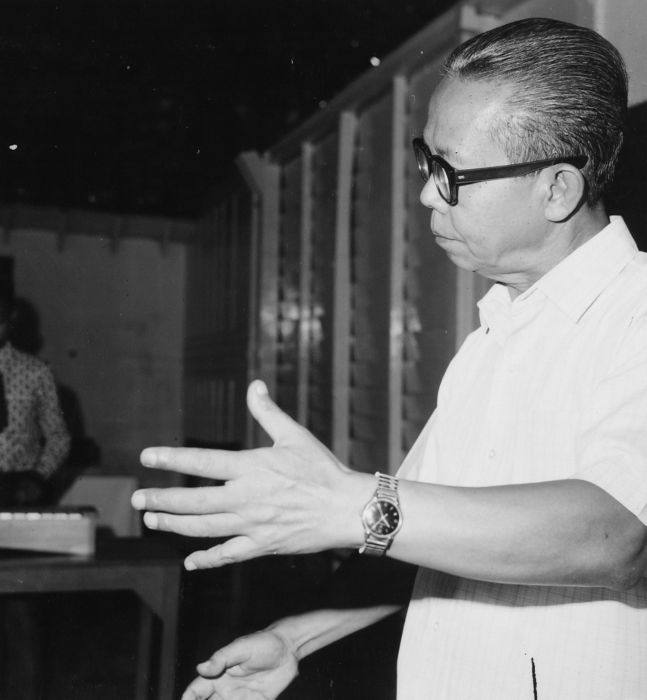
Daeng Soetigna in 1971.

Angklung padaeng is a musical instrument made of bamboo which is a modern variant of angklung. Traditional angklung used the slendro, pelog, and madenda scales. In 1938, Daeng Soetigna made an innovation so that the angklung could play diatonic notes. To appreciate his work, this angklung was named angklung padaeng, which comes from the words Pa (father, respected adult male) and Daeng (the inventor's name). The tuning used is diatonic, according to the western music system, and can even be presented in an orchestral form.

In line with music theory, the angklung padaeng is divided into two groups: the melodic angklung and the akompanimen angklung. A melody angklung specifically consists of two sound tubes with a pitch difference of one octave. In one angklung unit, generally there are 31 small melodic angklung and 11 large melodic angklung. Meanwhile, the akompanimen angklung is used as an accompaniment to play harmonic tones. The voice tube consists of three to four, according to a diatonic chord. After Daeng Soetigna's innovation, other reforms continued to develop. Some of them are sarinande angklung, arumba, toel angklung, and Sri Murni angklung. After Daeng Soetigna, one of his students, Udjo Ngalagena, continued his efforts by establishing saung angklung in the Bandung area. To this day, the area known as Saung Angklung Udjo is still a center of creativity with regard to angklung.

==== Angklung sarinande ====
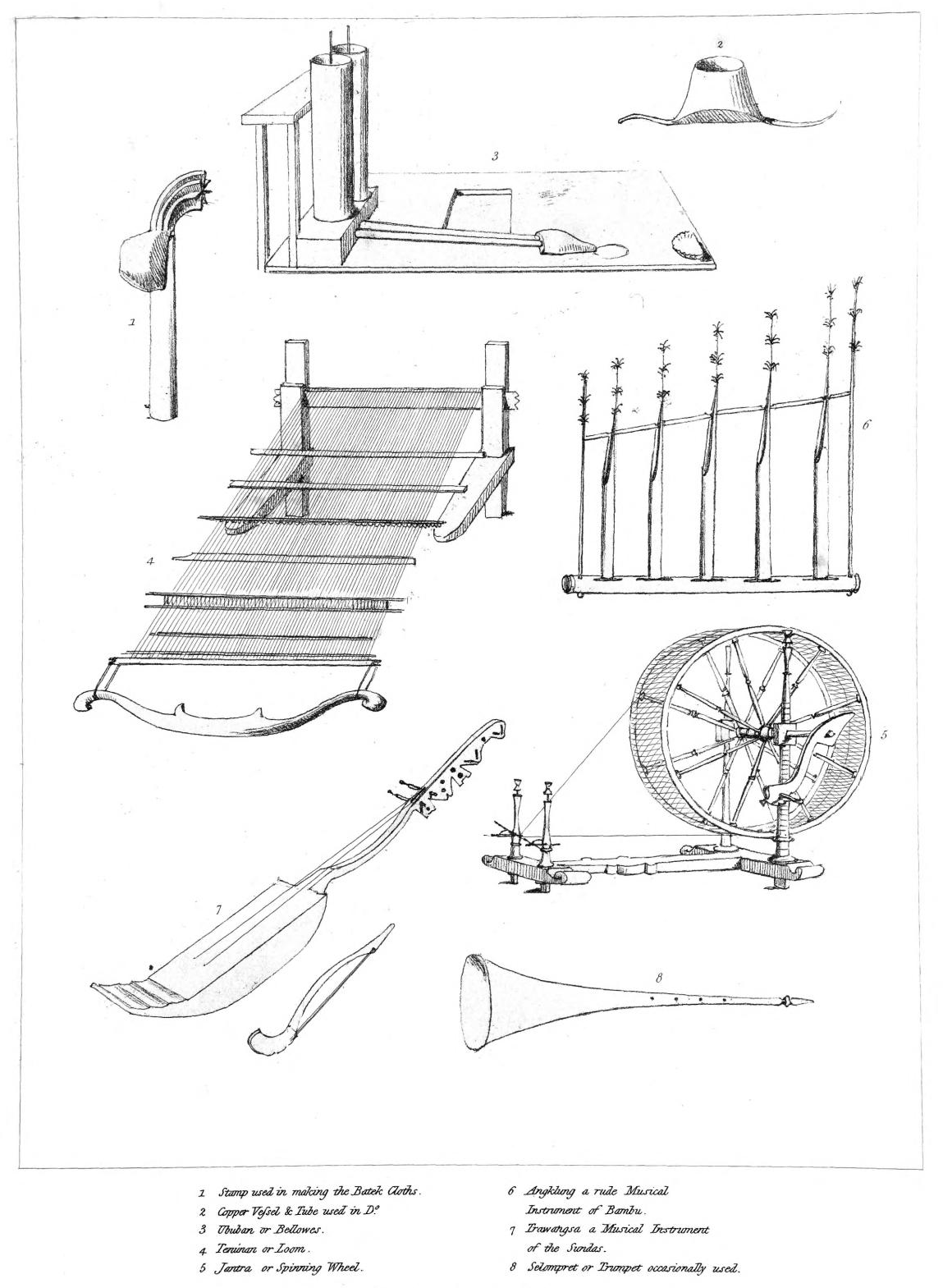
Angklung musical instrument, The History of Java by Thomas Stamford Raffles (1817).

Angklung sarinande is a term for angklung padaeng that only uses round tones (without chromatic tones) with a basic tone of C. The small unit of angklung sarinande contains 8 angklung (Low to High Do tones), while angklung sarinande plus contains 13 angklung (Low to High Sol until High mi).

==== Angklung arumba ====
Angklung arumba is a musical ensemble of various musical instruments made of bamboo. Angklung arumba was born around the 1960s in West Java, Indonesia, and is now a typical West Javanese musical instrument. In 1964, Yoes Roesadi and his friends formed a musical group that specifically added angklung to its ensemble line. They got the idea to call themselves the Arumba group (Alunan Rumpun Bambu – Strains of Bamboo). With the passage of time, the term arumba finally stuck as an ensemble of bamboo music from West Java. Angklung arumba is a term for a set of musical instruments consisting of at least:

- ) Angklung – One unit of melody angklung, hung so that it can be played by one person
- ) Lodong (big bamboo) – One lodong bass unit, also lined up so that it can be played by one person
- ) Gambang I – Melody bamboo xylophone
- ) Gambang II – Companion bamboo xylophone
- ) Kendang – Traditional drum

==== Angklung toel ====
Angklung toel is a variant of the conventional angklung. It was created by Kang Yayan Udjo from Saung Angklung Udjo in 2008. It differs from the conventional angklung in its placement. This angklung has a waist-high frame with several angklungs lined up upside down and given a rubber band. It is played in a way similar to a piano. People who want to play Angklung toel simply 'touch' (toel) the angklung according to the tone and the angklung will vibrate for a while because of the rubber.

==== Angklung sri murni ====
Angklung sri murni was created from the idea of Eko Mursito Budi for the purposes of angklung robots. One angklung uses two or more sound tubes with the same tone, so that it will produce a pure tone (mono-tonal). This is different from the multi-tonal in angklung Padaeng. With this simple idea, the robot can easily play a combination of several angklungs simultaneously to imitate the effects of melodic angklung and accompaniment angklung.

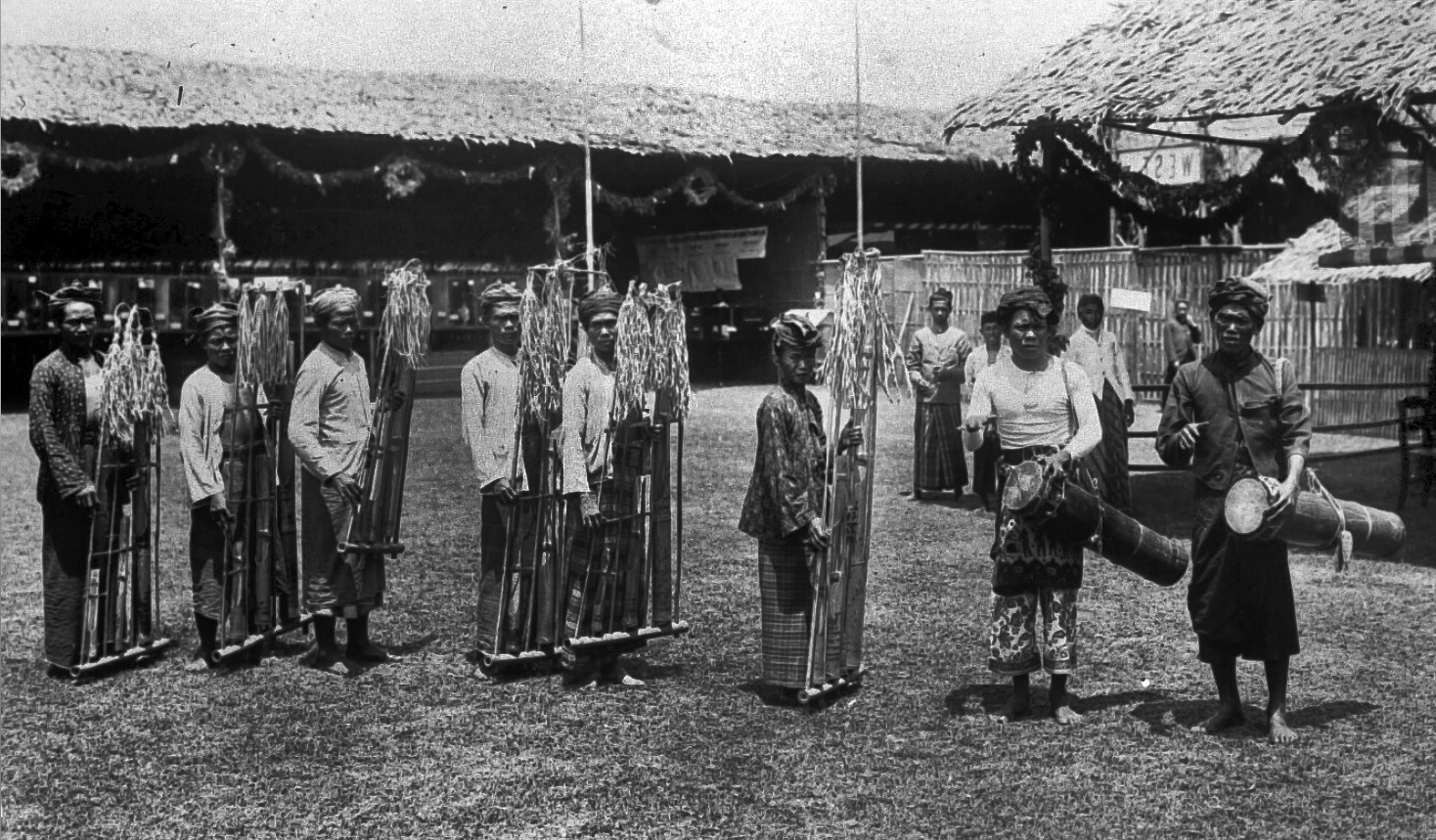
Angklung performance in Batavia (now Jakarta), c. 1910–1930.

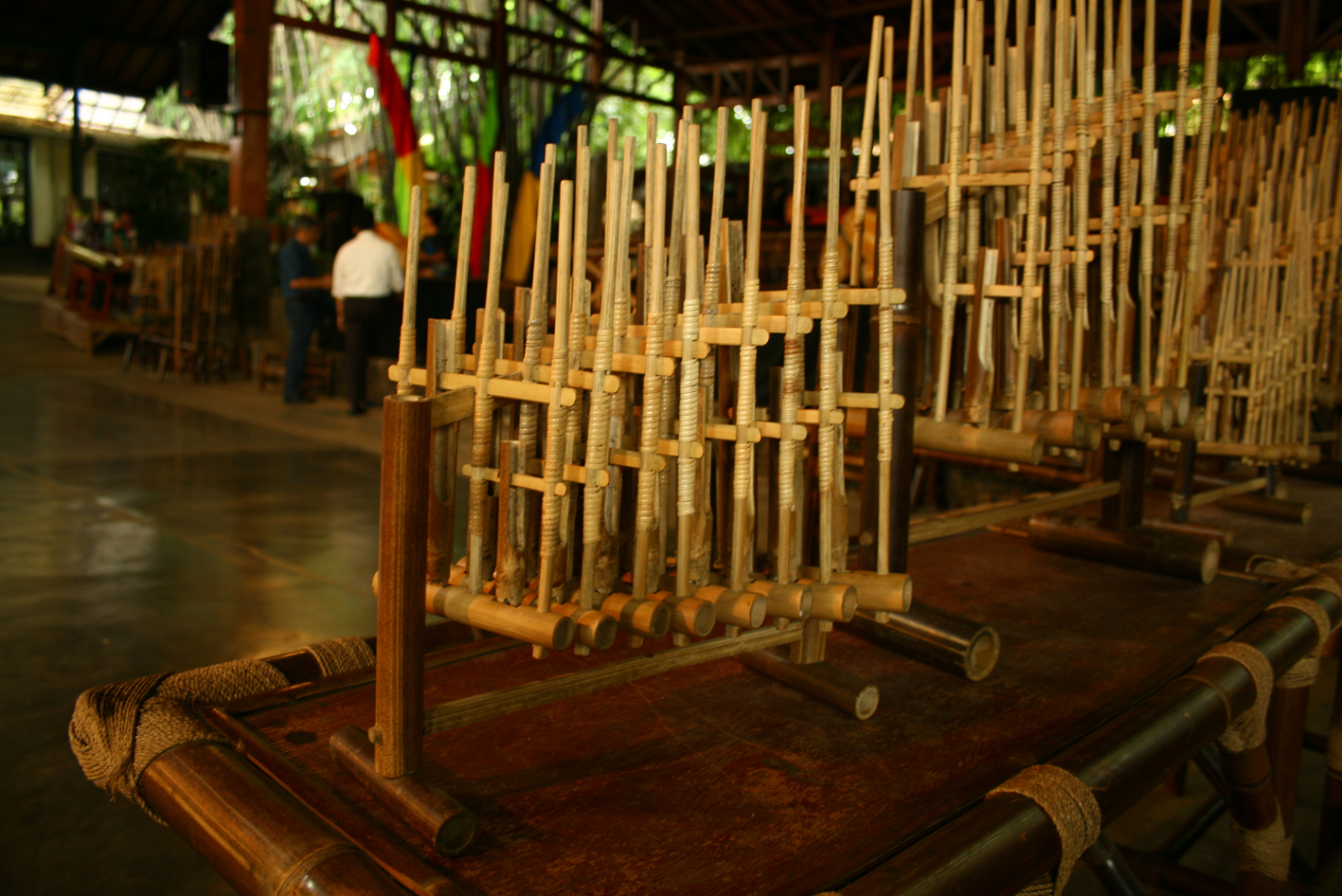
Angklung display.

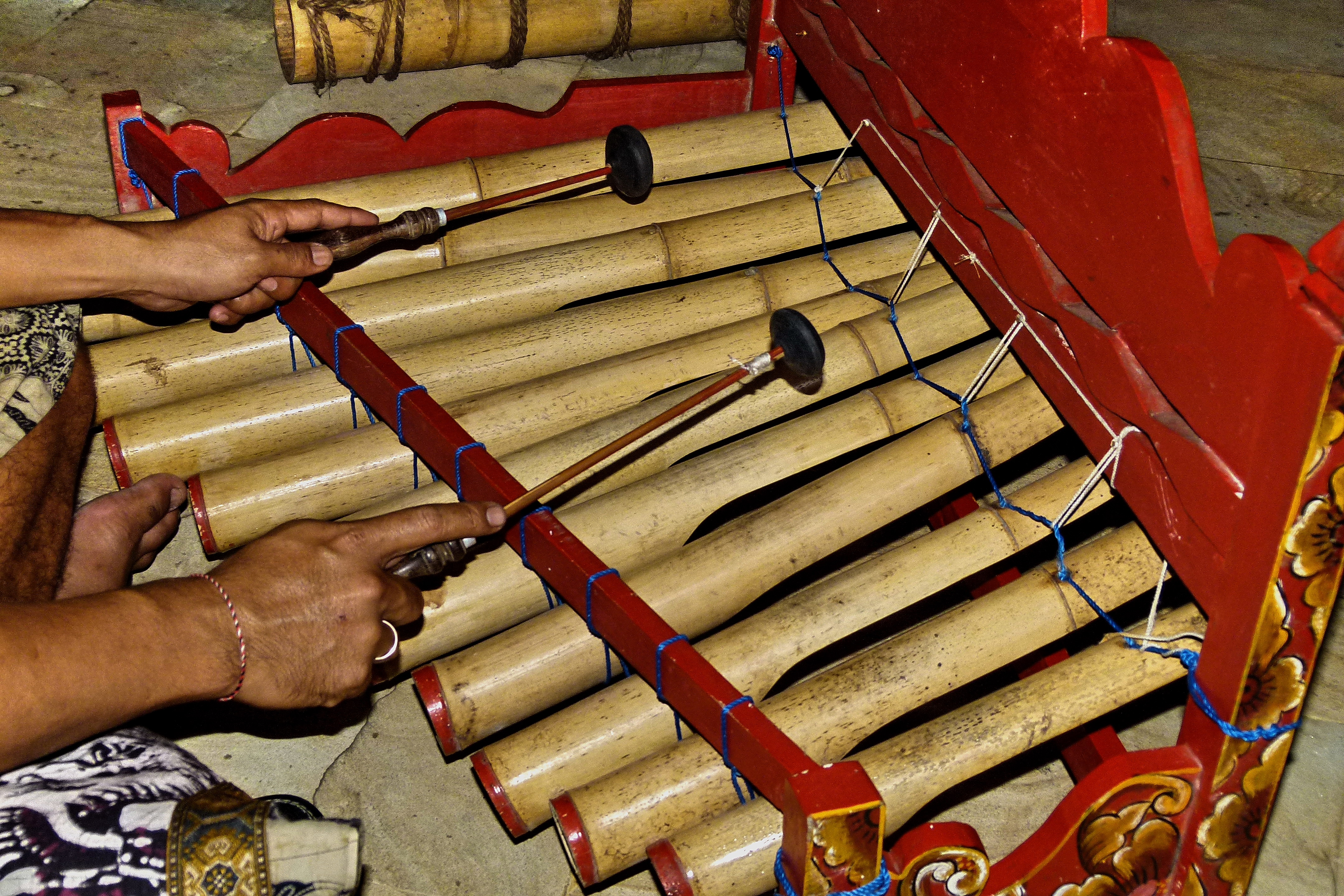
Calung Bali (Rindhik).

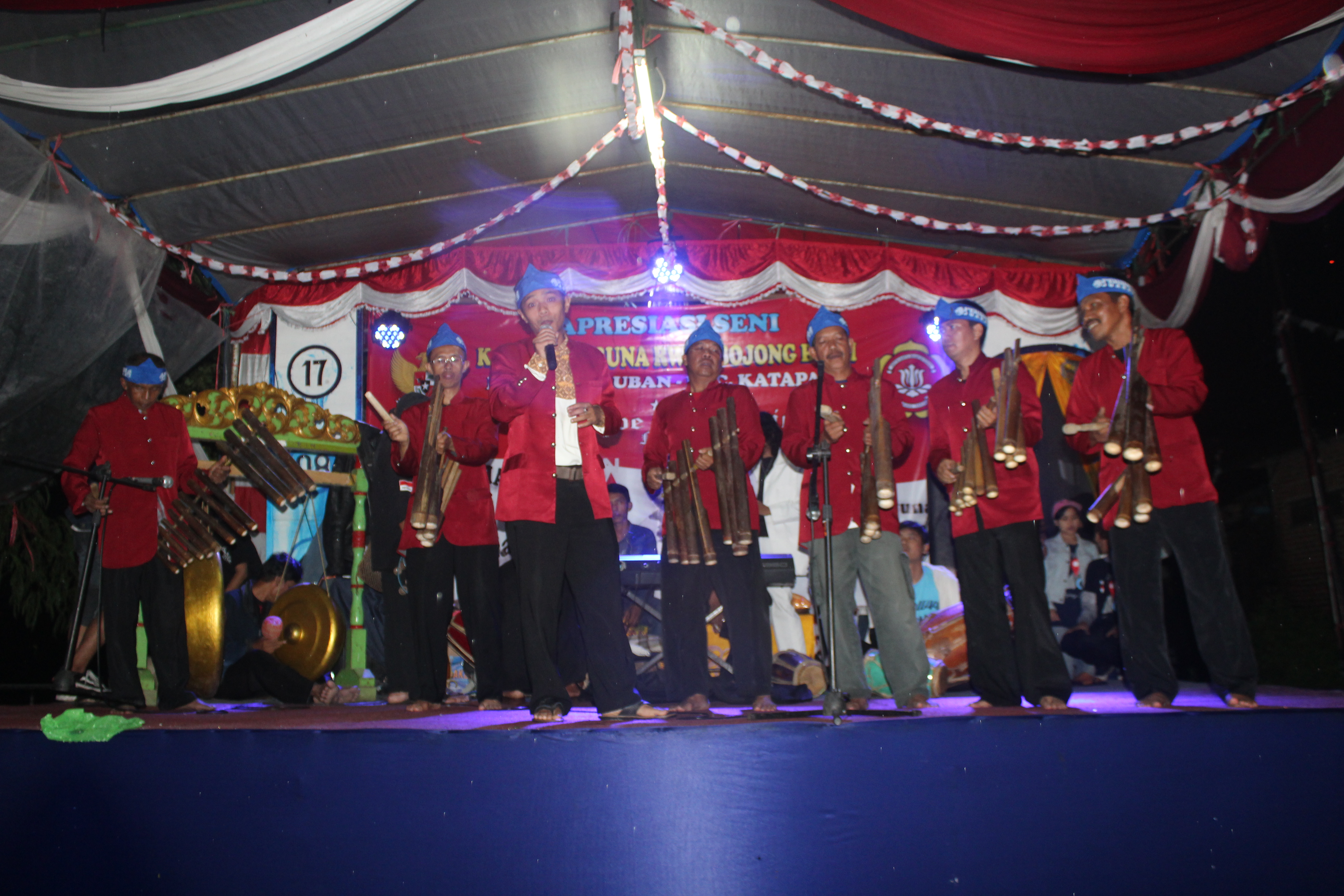
Calung jinjing performance in West Java.

== Notations ==
=== Sundanese Daminatila ===
It's a kind of numbered musical notation like the solfège, but it uses a different system: high numbers correspond to low tones, and vice versa. This system might seem to be counterintuitive to people who are already familiar with the western solfège. There are only 5 notes used in each scales: 1, 2, 3, 4, and 5, read as da, mi, na, ti, and la. The absolute tones depend on the scale used and the base frequency, which don't adhere to western standards. Traditional angklung have some common scales: saléndro, degung/pélog, and sorog/madenda.

=== Diatonic ===
Diatonic notation for angklung use a numbered musical notation in Indonesia, similar notation like Jianpu, but with some different standards, like the placement of rhythm lines positions and chord notations. The musical notation is written based on movable do. The musical notation displays 1 as relative do, 2 as relative re, etc. Higher octave marked with a dot above, and lower octave marked with a dot below.

Also, some alternatives notations is writing the exact written numbers on the single angklung to the musical sheet, usually marked 0–31, 0 is the lowest tone and 31 is the highest tone.

Some angklung types contains more than one notes usually marked with English chord notation, like C, Dm, Em, F, G, G7, Am, etc. This type of angklung is used for accompanying a musical piece.

== Cultural context ==
The creation and existence of angklung is important in the culture of the Indonesian people, especially the Sundanese people. At first, the function and manufacture of angklung were intended for certain events or ceremonies related to traditional ceremonies and rituals. Now, angklung has developed into traditional and modern musical instruments played in Indonesia and abroad. The following are some of the functions of angklung in Indonesian culture:

=== Offerings for Dewi Sri ===
In the old Sundanese tradition, angklung is played as a form of calling to Dewi Sri, a figure described as the goddess of fertility, who believed will gives blessings to rice plants so that they are fertile and prosperous for the community. The ceremony usually take place during Seren Taun rice harvesting and planting ceremony. This tradition is still carried out by the Baduy or Kanekes tribe, which is the remnant of the old Sundanese that still exists.

== Angklung center ==
One of the largest angklung conservation and development centers is Saung Angklung Udjo (SAU). Founded in 1966 by Udjo Ngalagena and his wife Uum Sumiati, with the aim of preserving the traditional Sundanese arts and culture, especially angklung. SAU is located at Jalan Padasuka 118, East Bandung, West Java, Indonesia.

SAU has a performance arena, a bamboo craft center, and a workshop for bamboo musical instruments. It also offers education and training aimed at preserving and developing Sundanese culture, especially angklung.

SAU holds regular performances every afternoon. The show includes a wayang golek demonstration, a helaran ceremony, traditional dance art, beginner angklung, orchestra angklung, mass angklung, and arumba. In addition to regular performances every afternoon, Saung Angklung Udjo also holds special performances in the morning or afternoon, and performs elsewhere in Indonesia and abroad. SAU also sells traditional bamboo musical instruments such as angklung, arumba and calung.

== Gamelan angklung ==
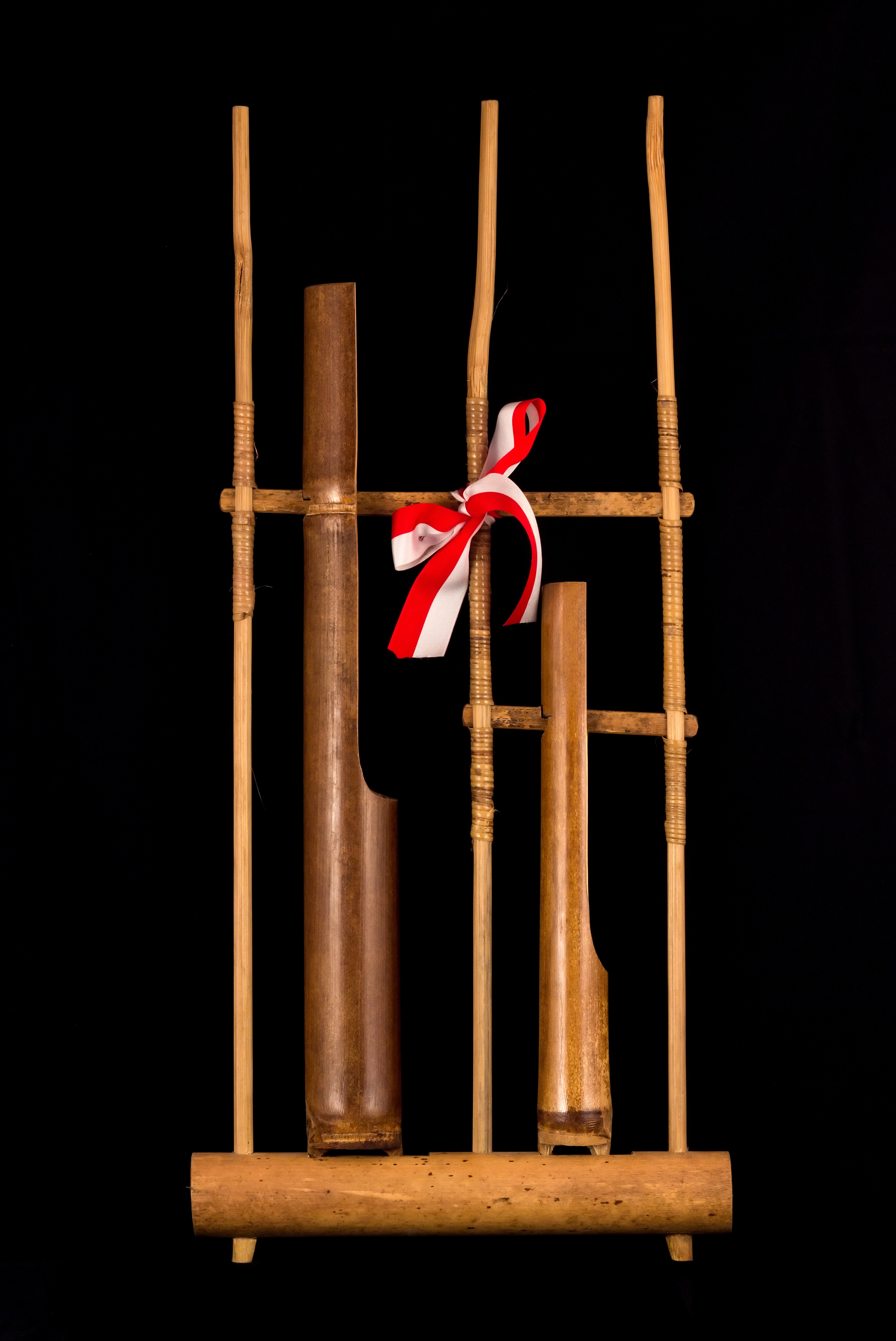
Single pitch angklung, for use in orchestras

In Bali, an ensemble of angklung is called a gamelan angklung. While the ensemble gets its name from the bamboo shakers, they are nowadays rarely included outside of East Bali. An ensemble of mostly bronze metallophones is used instead, generally with about 20 musicians.

While the instrumentation of the gamelan angklung is similar to gamelan gong kebyar, there are several critical differences. The instruments in the gamelan angklung are tuned to a 5-tone slendro scale, although most ensembles use a four-tone mode of the five-tone scale played on instruments with four keys. An exception is the five-tone angklung from the north of Bali, which is what as many as seven keys. In four-tone angklung groups, the flute players will occasionally use an implied fifth tone. Additionally, whereas many of the instruments in gong kebyar span multiple octaves of its pentatonic scale, most gamelan angklung instruments only contain one octave, although some five-tone ensembles have roughly an octave and a half. The instruments are considerably smaller than those of the gong kebyar.

Gamelan angklung is heard in Balinese temples, where it supplies musical accompaniment to temple anniversaries (odalan). It is also characteristic of rituals related to death (pitra yadnya), and is therefore connected in Balinese culture to the invisible spiritual realm and transitions from life to death and beyond. Because of their portability, gamelan angklung instruments may be carried in processions while a funeral bier is carried from temporary burial in a cemetery to the cremation site. The musicians also often play music to accompany the cremation ceremony. Thus, many Balinese listeners associate angklung music and its slendro scale with strong emotions evoking a combination of sacred sweetness and sadness.

The structure of the music is similar to gong kebyar, although employing a four-tone scale. A pair of jegog metallophones carries the basic melody, which is elaborated by gangsa, reyong, ceng-ceng, flute, and small drums played with mallets. A medium-sized gong, called kempur, is generally used to punctuate a piece's major sections.

Most older compositions do not employ the gong kebyar's more ostentatious virtuosity and showmanship. Recently, many Balinese composers have created kebyar-style works for gamelan angklung or have rearranged kebyar melodies to fit the angklung's more restricted four-tone scale. These new pieces often feature dance, so the gamelan angklung is augmented with heavier gongs and larger drums. Additionally, some modern composers have created experimental instrumental pieces for the gamelan angklung.

== Outside Indonesia ==
In the early 20th century during the time of the Dutch East Indies, the angklung was adopted in Thailand, where it is called angkalung (อังกะลุง). It was recorded that angklung was brought to Siam in 1908 by Luang Pradit Pairoh, a royal musician in the entourage of Field Marshal Prince Bhanurangsi Savangwongse of Siam, who paid a royal visit to Java that year (27 years after the first state visit of his elder brother, King Chulalongkorn, to Java in 1871). The Thai angklung are typically tuned in the Thai tuning system of seven equidistant steps per octave, and each angklung has three bamboo tubes tuned in three separate octaves rather than two, as is typical in Indonesia.

In 2008, a celebration was held in Thai traditional music circles to mark the 100th anniversary of the introduction of angklung to Thailand. Both the Thai and Indonesian governments supported the celebration.

The angklung has also been adopted by its Austronesian-speaking neighbors, in particular by Malaysia and the Philippines, where they are played as part of bamboo xylophone orchestras. Formally introduced into Malaysia sometime after the end of the Confrontation, angklung found immediate popularity. They are generally played using a pentatonic scale similar to the Indonesian slendro, although in the Philippines, sets also come in the diatonic and minor scales used to perform various Spanish-influenced folk music in addition to native songs in pentatonic.

At least one Sundanese angklung buncis ensemble exists in the United States. Angklung Buncis Sukahejo is an ensemble at The Evergreen State College, and includes eighteen double rattles (nine tuned pairs) and four dog-dog drums.

== World record ==
On 9 July 2011, 5,182 people from many nations played angklung together in Washington, D.C., and are listed in the Guinness Book of Records as the largest angklung ensemble.

On Saturday, 5 August 2023, Indonesia set a Guinness World Records record for the largest angklung ensemble, with 15,110 participants at the Bung Karno Stadium, Jakarta. The event was attended by the Indonesian President Joko Widodo with the ministers of the cabinet.

== Gallery ==
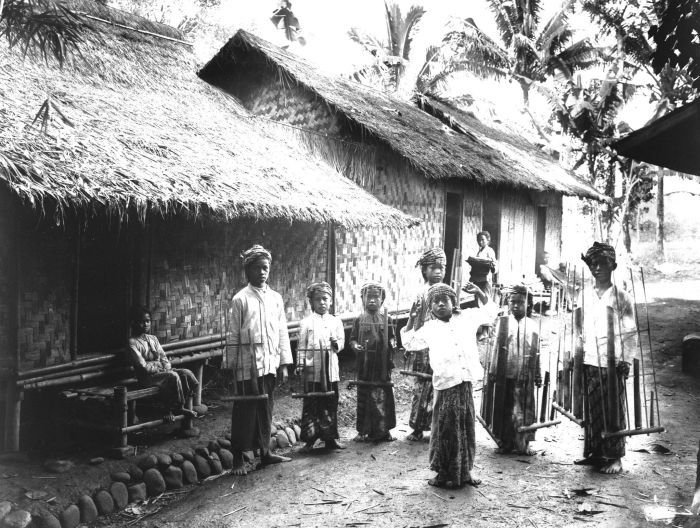
Young dancer accompanied by angklung players in Baduy, Banten. c. 1910-1930.

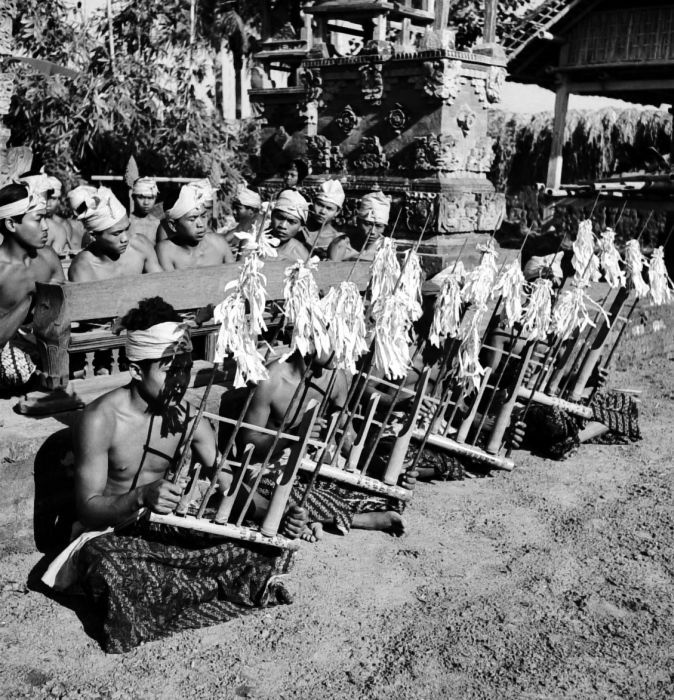
Angklung players, Indonesia, 1949.

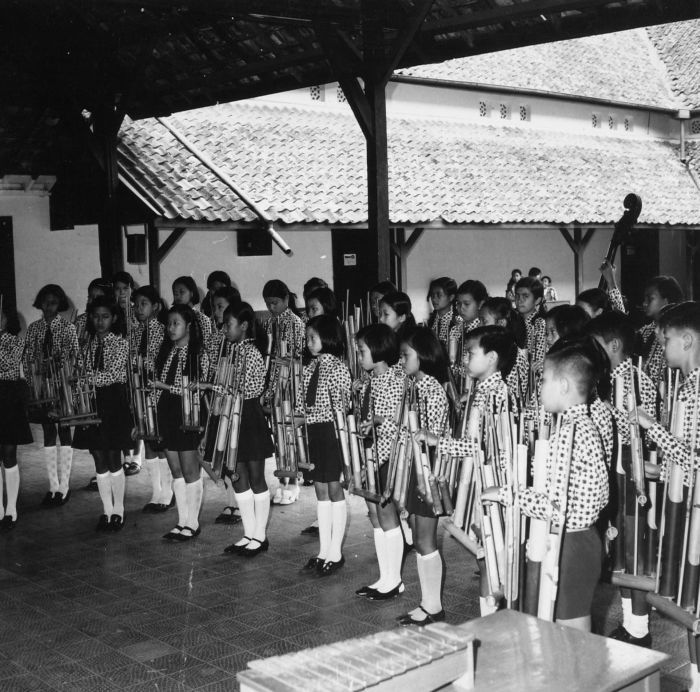
Angklung Orchestra, Indonesia in 1971.

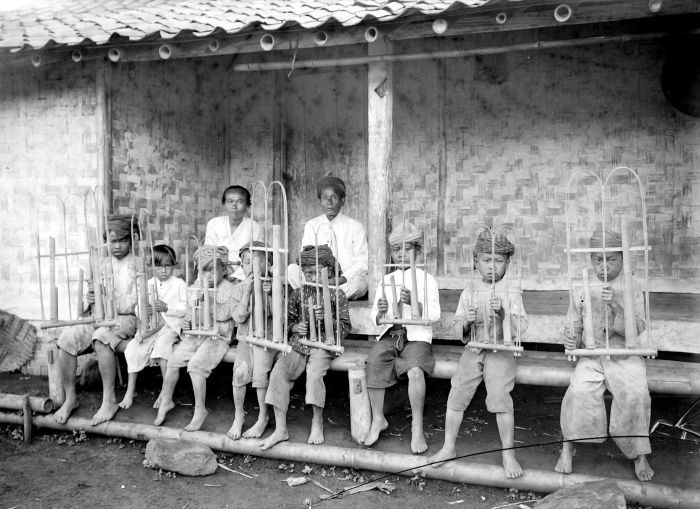
Sundanese boys playing the angklung in 1918.

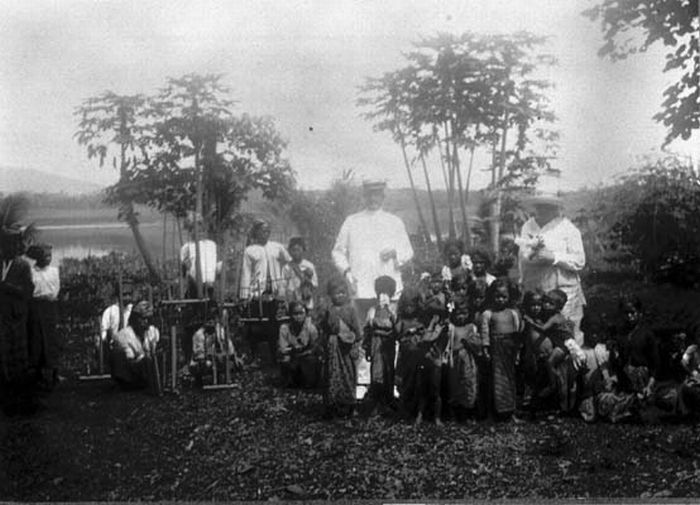
Children with angklung players at Lake Bagendit.

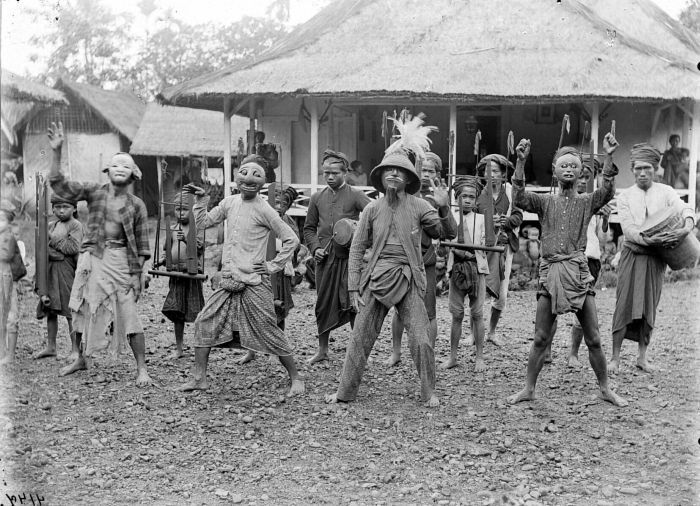
Angklung and dancers.

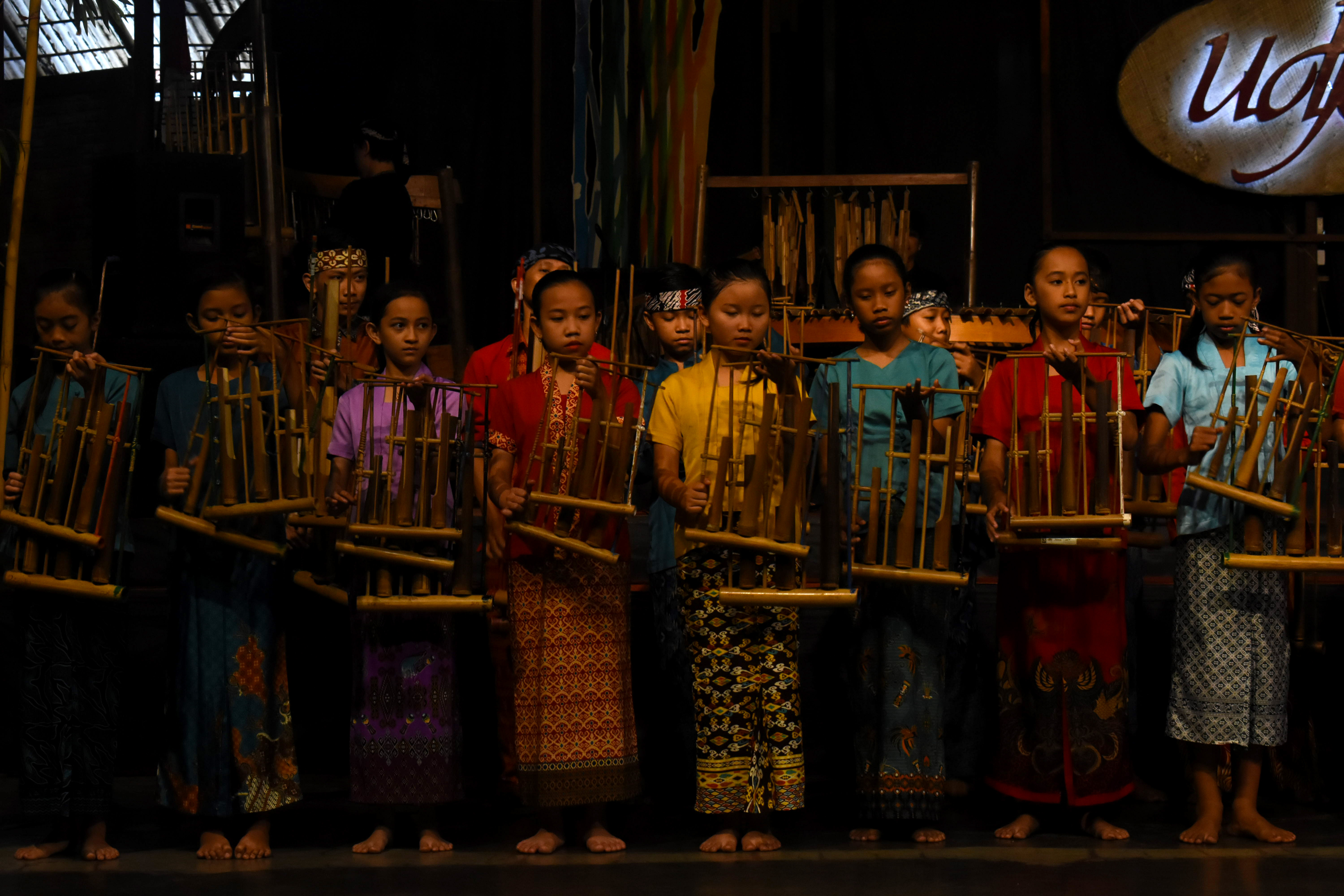
Playing Angklung.

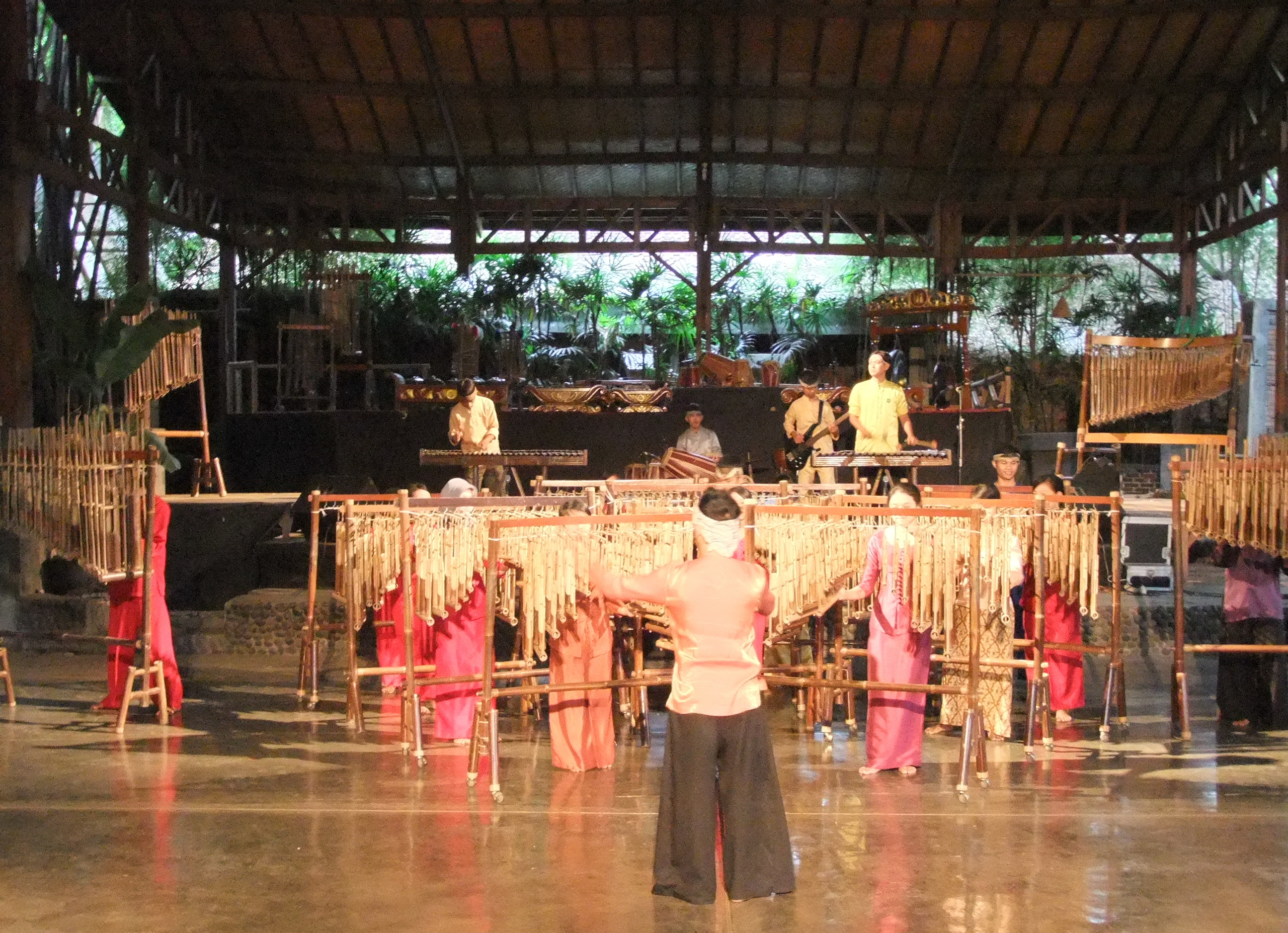
Angklung orchestra at Saung Angklung Udjo, Indonesia.

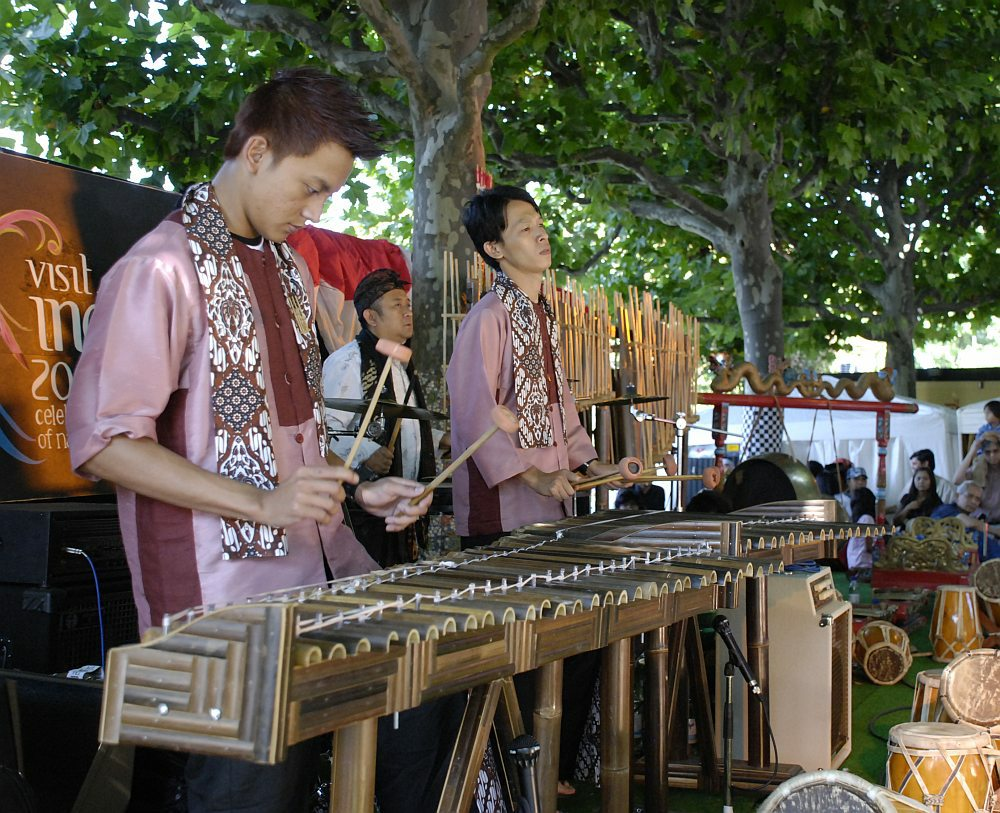
Angklung calung performance in Frankfurt, Germany.

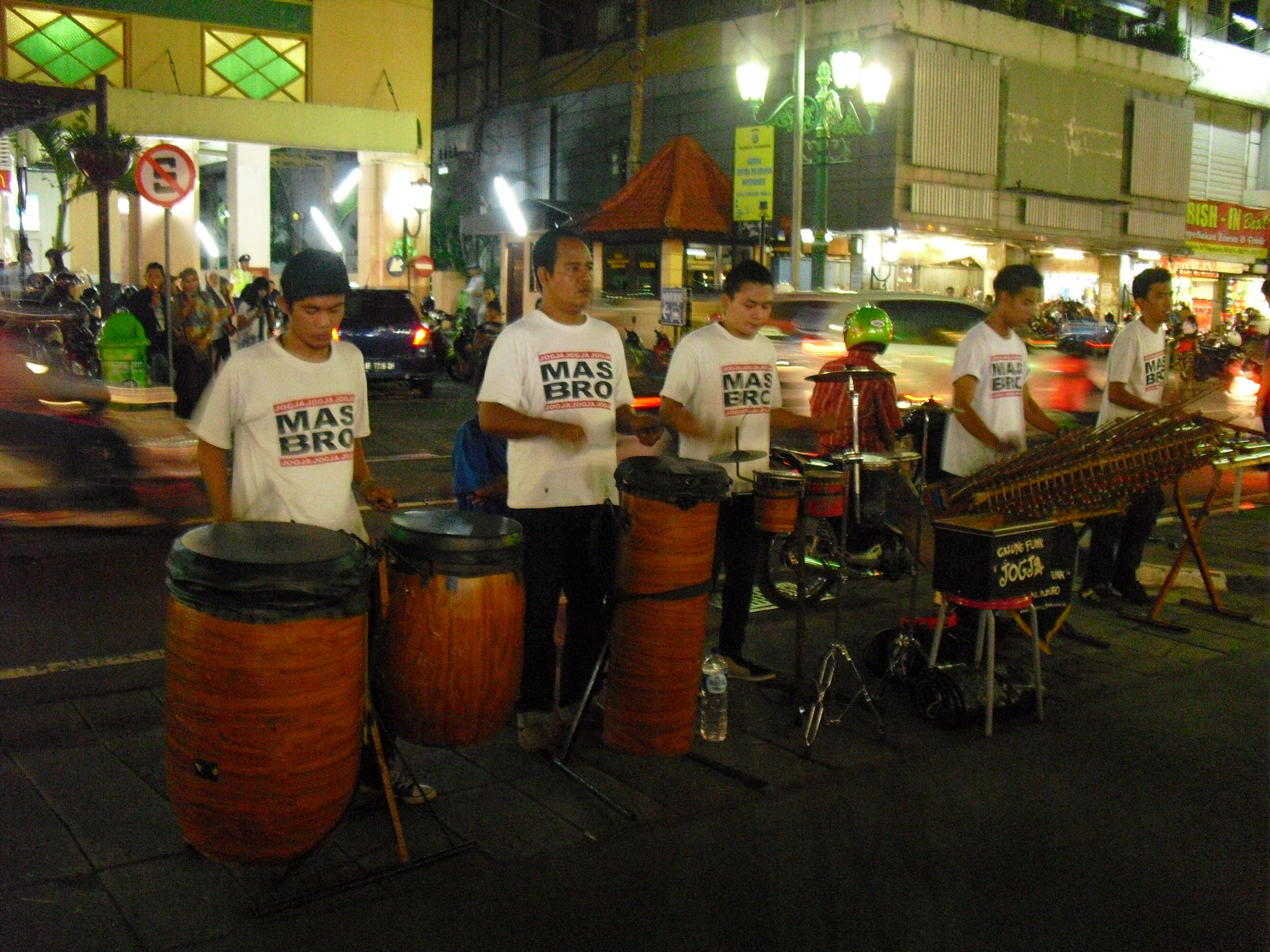
Angklung toel performance in Malioboro street in Yogyakarta.

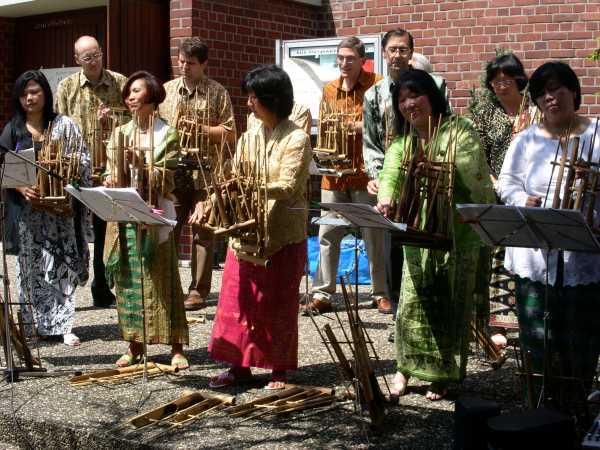
MKIF Angklung Group performance in Germany.

== See also ==
- Music of Indonesia
- Gamelan
- Talempong
