= Deng (South Sudanese name) =

Deng is a common first or last name used among the Dinka people of South Sudan, meaning "rain". It is often given to boys who are born when it is raining. It is also believed to be the name of an ancestor, the first son of the god Nhialic.

== Given name ==
People with the name originating in South Sudan include:

- Deng Adel (born 1996), South Sudan-born Australian basketball player
- Deng Adut (born c. 1983), defence lawyer in New South Wales, Australia
- Deng Deng Akon (born 1964), South Sudanese politician
- Deng Deng Akuei, South Sudanesee politician
- Deng Deng (born 1992), South Sudanese-Australian basketball player
- Deng Gai (born 1982), South Sudanese basketball player
- Deng Alor Kuol, South Sudanese politician

== Surname ==
- Abiol Lual Deng (born 1983), American political scientist
- Aheu Deng (born 1986), South Sudanese model
- Ajak Deng (born 1989), Australian fashion model
- Ajou Deng (born 1978), British basketball player; older son of Aldo
- Aldo Deng, former South Sudanese politician (1967–1989), father of Ajou Deng and Luol Deng
- Ataui Deng (born 1991), Sudanese-American model
- Dominic Dim Deng (1950–2008), South Sudanese military commander
- Joseph Deng (born 1998), Australian middle distance runner
- Francis Deng, South Sudanese politician
- Luol Deng (born 1985), South Sudan-born British basketball player; younger son of Aldo
- Majok Deng (born 1993), Australian basketballer
- Peter Deng (born 1992), Australian footballer
- Thomas Deng (born 1997), Australian footballer
- Valentino Achak Deng, South Sudanese refugee and activist in the U.S.

== Middle name ==
- David Deng Athorbei (born c. 1948) South Sudanese politician
- Taban Deng Gai (born c. 1950), South Sudanese politician
- Abdallah Deng Nhial, (born c. 1954), South Sudanese politician
- Nhial Deng Nhial, South Sudanese politician
- William Deng Nhial (1929 – 1968), Sudanese politician
- Santino Deng Wol, South Sudan People's Defence Forces officer

== See also ==
- Deng (Chinese surname) for the Chinese name
