= Gamelan surakarta =

Indonesian musical instrument

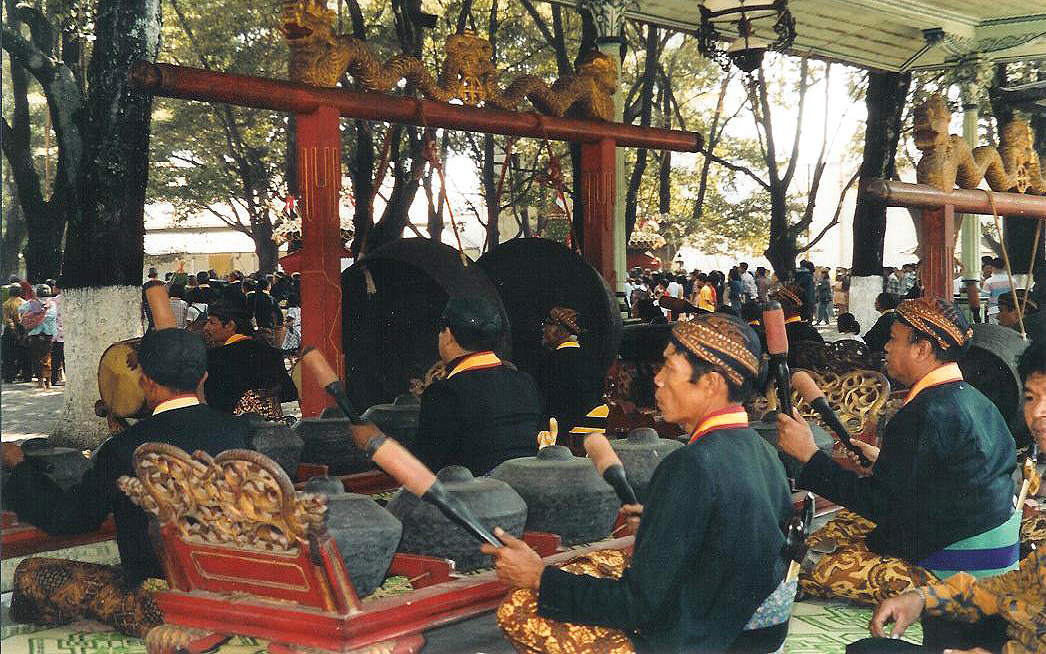
Gamelan surakarta performance

Gamelan surakarta is one of two subtly distinct styles of gamelan playing that have emerged in central Java since 1755. In contrast to yogyakarta, the Surakarta style is known for its intricate, soft style of playing.

== Description ==
A typical large, double gamelan in contemporary solo (Surakarta) will include, in the sléndro set, one saron panerus (or saron peking), two saron barung, one or two saron demung, one gendér panerus, one gender barung, one slenthem (or "gender panembung"), one bonang panerus and one bonang barung (each with twelve gongs), one gambang kayu, one siter or celempung, one rebab, one suling, one pair of kethuk and kempyang, one set of three to five kenong, one set of three to five kempul, one to three gong suwukan, and one gong ageng.

The complementary set of pelog instruments will include two each of gender panerus, gender barung, gambang and siter or celempung, the first of each pair tuned to the pelog bem subset of five tones (tones 1,2,3,5,6), the second to the pelog barang subset of five tones (2,3,5,6,7). The pelog bonang will each have fourteen gongs.

The slendro and pelog gamelan will usually share the drums (kendang), including one each of ketipung, kendang ageng (or kendang gendhing), ciblon, kendang wayangan, and, in the largest gamelan, a large hanging drum, the bedug. Archaic ensembles may still include such instruments as the gambang gangsa, slentho (in place of slenthem), and bonang panembung. A typical performance ensemble includes a female vocal soloist (pesinden) and male chorus (gerongan); in certain passages, the singers clap rhythmically (keplok).

== Comparison to Gamelan Yogyakarta ==
In Yogyakarta, there is a tendency to have more sarons of each register and it is more likely that the bonang panembung will be present. An archaic instrument, the celuring, a set of struck bells is found only on a few gamelan in the Yogyakarta Kraton and is played in place of the saron panerus. The Solonese style is often considered more refined (or "alus") than Yogyanese style. One specific difference is in saron peking playing; although the pattern it plays for the balungan is often the same, in the Yogyanese style it is rhythmically shifted earlier, creating a different emphasis in relation to the balungan.

== See also ==
- Gamelan
- Gamelan sekaten
- Gamelan selunding
- Gamelan siteran
- Music of Indonesia
- Music of Java
