= Gamelan Gadhon =

Style of gamelan music

A gamelan gadhon is an ensemble consisting of the 'soft' instruments of the Javanese gamelan. This can include rebab, gendér, gendér panerus, voice, slenthem, suling, siter, gong, kempul, kenong, and kendhang.

== The instruments and their functions ==
The rebab, a two-stringed fiddle, is the melodic leader of the ensemble. The rebab player signals changes between sections of a piece, and to a new piece.

The gendér is a tube-resonated metallophone with fourteen keys suspended by string above metal tubes. The gendér plays improvisatory patterns called cengkok which link one seleh note to the next. Each pattern can be played in many ways and the musician chooses how to play each one at the time, according to the style of the piece, the pathet, the irama, and other musical considerations.

The slenthem is a low-pitched tube-resonated metallophone played with a large padded mallet held in one hand, with the other hand is used for damping the ringing key as a new key is sounded. The melodic framework of a piece, sometimes called the balungan, is played on the slenthem.

The kendhang, two-headed drums played with the hands, control the tempo of the music and signal changes in irama. Different drums are used according to the style of the music; some lively and others more restrained. The kendhang player usually begins and ends on the ketipung and kendhang ageng, switching to more elaborate patterns on the medium-sized ciblon drum.

The gongs — kempul (small hanging gongs) and kenong (large horizontal gongs) — act as structural markers and punctuate the form, depending on the type of piece being played. The gong ageng (large gong) marks the end of each of the largest melodic phrases; these are called gongan, and a piece can have one or several of these.

Several other instruments can also be included: the gambang (xylophone), suling (end-blown bamboo flute), and siter (plucked stringed instrument). Vocal parts called gerong (for male singers) or sindhen (for female singers) can be added in certain sections of pieces, as can alok, vocal cries that accent certain parts of the form or melody.

== See also ==
- Gamelan
- Munggang
- Salendro
- Music of Java
