= Panerusan =

Indonesian musical rhythmic structure used in Gamelan

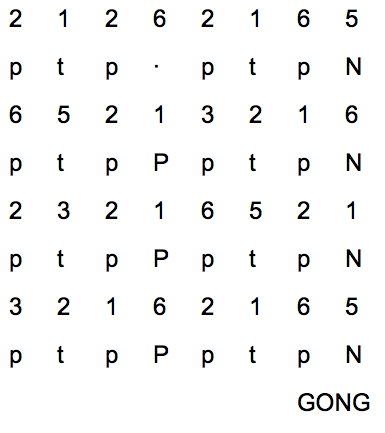
Ladrang form on the balugan instruments. GONG = gong ageng.

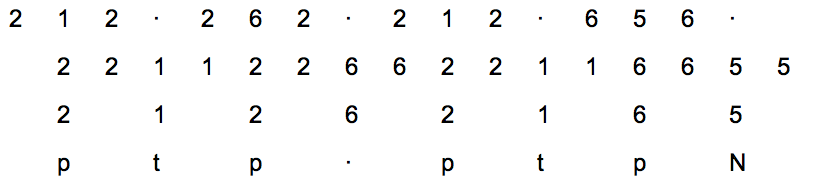
First line of ladrang form shown above (bottom) with possible balungan (top) and panerus (middle) elaborations.

The panerusan instruments or elaborating instruments are one of the divisions of instruments used in Indonesian gamelan. Instead of the rhythmic structure provided by the colotomic instruments, and the core melody of the balungan instruments, the panerusan instruments play variations on the balungan. They are usually the most difficult instruments to learn in the gamelan, but provide the most opportunity for improvisation and creativity in the performer.

Panerusan instruments include the gendér, suling, rebab, siter/celempung, bonang, and gambang. The female singer, the pesindhen, is also often included, as she sings in a similar fashion to the instrumental techniques. As these include the only wind instruments, string instruments, and wooden percussion instruments found in the gamelan, they provide a timbre which stands out from most of the gamelan.

The notes that the panerusan instruments play are largely in melodic formulas known as cengkok and sekaran. These are selected from a huge collection which every performer carries in his head, based on the patet, mood, and traditions surrounding a piece.

== Sekaran ==
Sekaran (Javanese for "flowering") is a type of elaboration used in the Javanese gamelan, especially on the bonang barung.

It is similar to the cengkok of other elaborating instruments in its floridity and openness to improvisation, but a sekaran generally happens only at the end of a nongan or other colotomic division. It is usually preceded by imbal, an interlocking pattern between the bonang barung and the bonang panerus.

Different sekaran are used in different pathet, but there are always a variety available. A good bonang player will choose a sekaran based on how the other instruments and the sindhen are improvising.

Traditionally the bonang panerus did not play sekaran, and simply continued in the imbal pattern, but now some players use sekaran, as long as they maintain the fast character of typical bonang panerus parts.

== See also ==
- Gamelan
- Slendro
- Pathet
- Cengkok
- Seleh
- Music of Indonesia
- Music of Java
