= Munggang =

Musical instruments of central Java

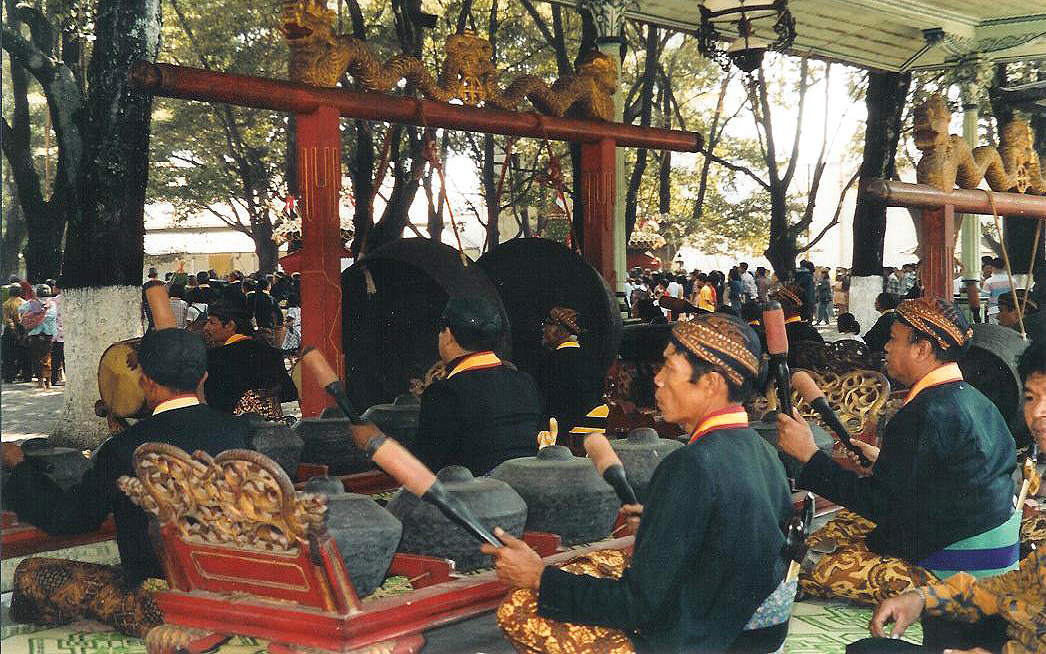
Munggang at the Kraton surakarta.

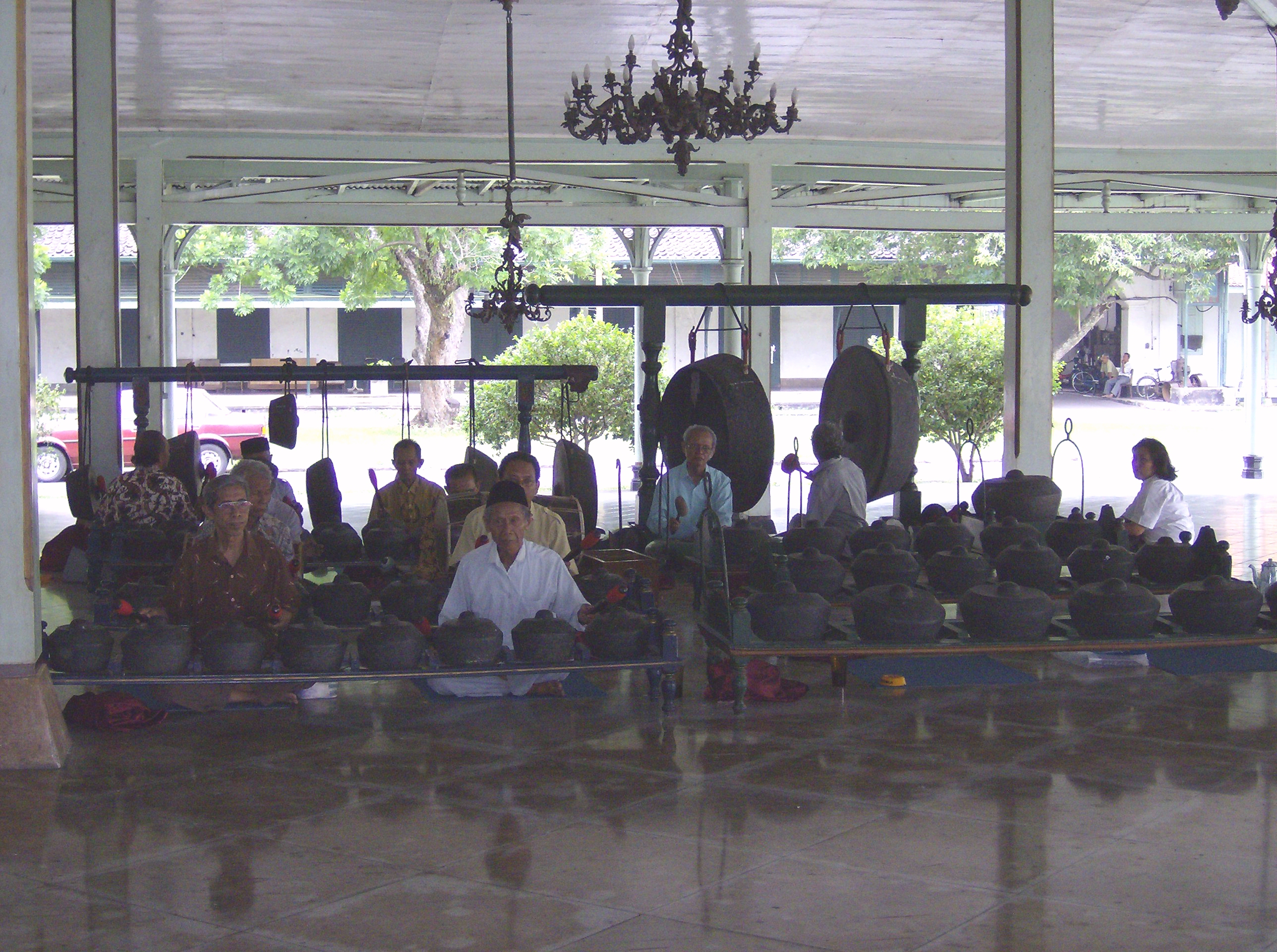
The gamelan munggang of the Mangkunegaran in Solo.

Gamelan Munggang are considered among the most ancient gamelans of the kraton (courts) of central Java. The ensemble of instruments consists of gong ageng, kempul, kendang and horizontal gong chimes tuned to three pitches. Very low in absolute pitch, each ensemble consists of two types: pelog and slendro. There is a repertory of several repetitive pieces, the best known permutation being high-middle-high-low. It is theorized that pelog was derived from the three note munggang scale. The origin of the munggang ensembles themselves are described in Javanese myths, however the first one may have been imported to Indonesia in the first century CE, with the first ensemble constructed by the Javanese made in the 4th century.

== See also ==
- Gamelan
- Gong gede
- Gamelan sekaten
- Gamelan surakarta
