= Raden Machjar Angga Koesoemadinata =

Indonesian musician (1902–1979)

Raden Machjar Angga Koesoemadinata (often written as Kusumadinata, Kusumahdinata, Kusumah Dinata or Anggakusumadinata), known as Pak Machjar or Pak Mahyar, was a Sundanese music composer and an Indonesian musicologist, specializing in pelog and salendro. He invented the Sundanese solfège system (da mi na ti la) and the Sundanese 17-tone model. He was born in Sumedang on 7 December 1902, and died in Bandung on 9 April 1979.

== Biography ==
Koesoemadinata is widely known among the Sundanese people as a composer. He wrote Sundanese traditional songs such as "Lemah Cai" (Our Native Land), "Dewi Sartika" and "Sinom Puspasari". He was also a playwright and director of Sundanese music-dramas called Rinenggasari; among those he wrote are Sarkam-Sarkim and Satan Mindo Wahyu Revelation (Satan Personification as Divine Revelation).

He formulated the Sundanese solfège system (da mi na ti la) and wrote many theoretical publications on Sundanese music, including Ilmu Seni Raras (Our Musical Art) (1969) and Ringkesan Pangawikan Rinenggaswara (An outline of music theory) (1950).

His research and experimentation on tone and scale systems led him in 1950 to his 17–tone Sundanese tuning and scale system, in which one octave consists of 17 equal intervals of 70^{10}/_{17} cents. (Weintraub (2001) suggests that Koesoemadinata was aware of 17-tone theories that had been developed for Persian art music, but another source close to Koesoemadinata considers that he would only have known of the western 12-note chromatic scale, as he had no access to world literature on ethnomusicology.)

Koesoemadinata's knowledge on the Sundanese pelog and salendro music system was acquired in his youth by learning to play the gamelan and the rebab, as well as by learning how to sing Sundanese tunes from Sundanese musicians and singers. He was introduced to science and western music theory when he was at the school for teachers (Kweekschool and Hogere Kweekaschool) in Sumedang, West Java, where he started his research on the frequency measurement of sounds from gamelan instruments and Sundanese singing. In 1923, he created the Sundanese solfège system (da mi na ti la) and wrote a book on Sundanese music theory entitled Elmuning Kawih Sunda (Science of Sundanese Music). After completing Hogere Kweekaschool, he worked as a teacher from 1924 to 1932, while he continued his research into the theory of Sundanese music.

Between 1927 and 1929, Koesoemadinata met Jaap Kunst, a Dutch ethnomusicologist who was conducting research on musical instruments in Java and Bali. They jointly wrote and published articles, and Koesoemadinata is often cited in Kunst's 1934 book De Toonkunst van Java. During this period, Koesoemadinata gained a better understanding of the frequencies of gamelan and of vocal sounds, and he started to perform frequency measurements using a monochord. He converted the frequency intervals into a logarithmic musical scale, using the concept of cents from Ellis (1884) and Hornbostel (1920) and Reiner's concept of musical rule.

In 1933, the colonial government commissioned Koesoemadinata to form a Sundanese music education system for all-indigenous schools in West Java. After the independence of Indonesia, from 1945 until 1947, he taught science, history and English for high school teachers in Bandung. The rest of his professional career was spent mainly as an expert for the Department of Culture of West Java in Bandung. He was also an adjunct lecturer at the Gamelan Conservatory in Surakarta, Central Java from 1953 to 1959. In 1958 (to 1959) he was appointed its director.

== Gamelan Ki Pembayun ==
In 1969, sponsored by the Government Tourism Industry in West Java, Koesoemadinata created a gamelan named Ki Pembayun (meaning the first-born), which is the largest ever bronze gamelan in Indonesia. This gamelan was designed to demonstrate Koesoemadinata's theory of 17-tone tuning and scale system. Ki Pembayun was prepared for a Ramayana international festival in Pandaan, Central Java, in 1971, but it was only ever played in rehearsal, because it was too difficult to play. Ki Pembayun was subsequently lost. Only a few photographs and some recordings of it survive; they may have been taken and recorded by Dr. Margaret Kartomi, professor of music at Monash University, Australia.

== External Source ==
1. Historical Precedents: The work of Machjar Koesoemadinata and Sapa’at Suwanda
2. Historical evidence for a nearly equidistant 9-tone gamelan pelog in Java
