= Keplok =

Musical clapping

Keplok is a style of clapping used in Javanese gamelan. The clapping is in a specific interlocking rhythmic pattern and is performed by the gerong when they are not singing. It is usually associated with the lively ciblon (Surakarta) or batangan (Yogyakarta) drumming. Usually one person claps on the on-beats while another claps on the off-beats, and then another pair clap a similar pattern at half the tempo. This interlocking pattern is similar to the imbal patterns played on the saron. Keplok is often performed along with senggakan.
