= Tubular bells =

Mallet percussion instrument

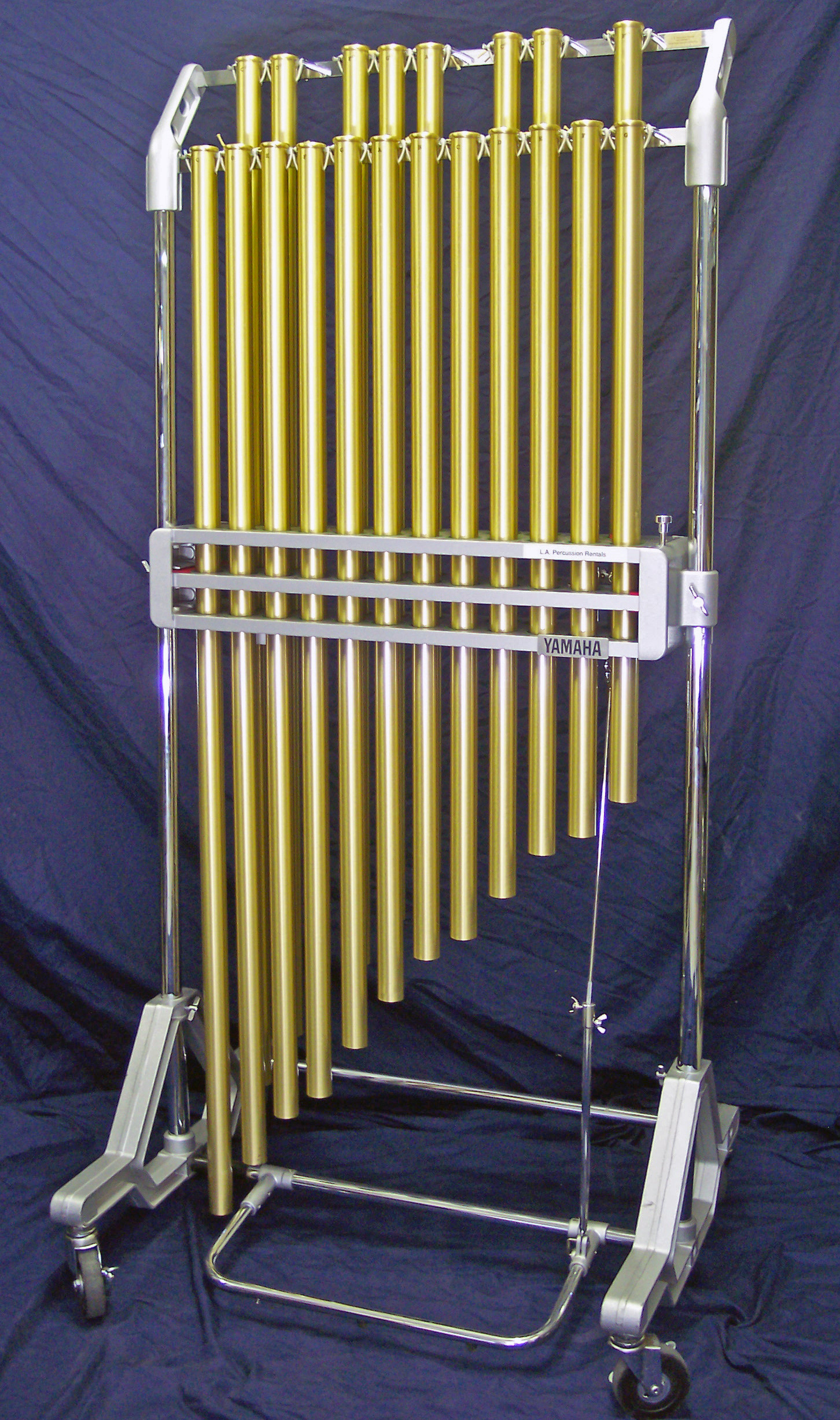
- A set of chimes made by Yamaha

Percussion instrument
- Other names: Chimes; orchestral chimes; orchestral bells; tubular chimes
- Classification: Keyboard percussion
- Hornbostel–Sachs classification: 111.232 (Sets of percussion tubes)

Playing range
- Standard tubular bells have a range of either 1.5 or 1.6 octaves. Specialty sets of chimes, such as bass chimes, may extend higher or lower.

Builders
- J.C. Deagan; Adams; Bergerault; Yamaha; Jenco; Premier Percussion; Ludwig-Musser

Tubular bells being played as part of a larger musical arrangement.

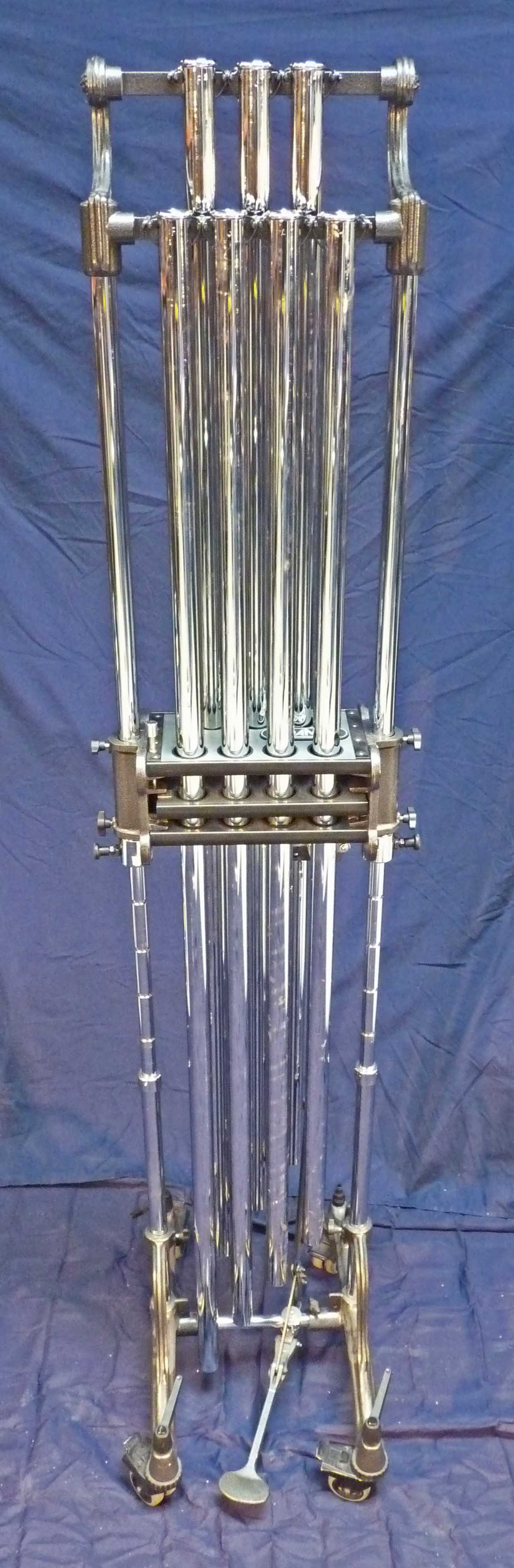
Adams Bass Chimes with a range of F_{3}–B_{3}

Tubular bells (also known as chimes) are a percussion instrument consisting of pitched metal tubes. These tubes are generally made of brass and may be chrome-plated. They are about 30–38 mm (1 1/4–1 1/2 in) in diameter and tuned by altering their length. Their sound resembles that of church bells, carillons, or a bell tower; the original tubular bells were made to duplicate such sounds within an ensemble.

Tubular bells are usually struck on the top edges of the tubes with a rawhide- or plastic-headed hammer. A sustain pedal is usually attached to the instrument to allow the damping and un-damping of all the bells at once. Very loud, high-pitched overtones can be produced by vibrating the bottoms of the tubes with a violin bow.

The written range of chimes is usually seen as C_{4} to F_{5}, though some professional models reach G_{_{5}}. There is disagreement on the exact transposition of octave, with some manufacturers listing the lowest note as a C_{5}. Additionally, some listeners place the pitch as a C_{3}, one octave below where written. This is due to the complex overtones associated with the instrument.

In tubular bells, modes 4, 5, and 6 appear to determine the strike tone and have frequencies in the ratios 9^{2}:11^{2}:13^{2} (or 81:121:169) "which are close enough to the ratios 2:3:4 for the ear to consider them nearly harmonic and to use them as a basis for establishing a virtual pitch". The perceived "strike pitch" is thus an octave below the fourth mode (i.e., the missing "1" in the above series).

== Repertoire ==
Tubular bells were first used in an orchestra by Giuseppe Verdi in his operas Rigoletto (1851), Il trovatore (1853) and Un ballo in maschera (1859).

Other notable uses in classical music include:

- Modest Mussorgsky – Boris Godunov (1869, 1872, 1874)
- Pyotr Ilyich Tchaikovsky – 1812 Overture (1880)
- Pietro Mascagni – Cavalleria rusticana (1890)
- Ruggero Leoncavallo – Pagliacci (1892)
- Gustav Mahler – Symphony No. 2 (1895)
- Giacomo Puccini – Tosca (1900)
- Alexander Scriabin – Le Poème de l'extase (1908)
- Claude Debussy – Ibéria (1910)
- Gustav Holst – The Planets (1914–1916)
- Giacomo Puccini – Turandot (1926)
- Edgard Varèse – Ionisation (1931)
- Richard Strauss – Die schweigsame Frau (1935)
- Paul Hindemith – Symphonic Metamorphosis of Themes by Carl Maria von Weber (1944)
- Benjamin Britten – Albert Herring (1945)
- Aaron Copland – Symphony No. 3 (1946)
- Olivier Messiaen – Turangalîla-symphonie (1946–1948)
- Carl Orff – Antigonae (1949)
- Dmitri Shostakovich – Symphony No. 11 (1957)
- Olivier Messiaen – Chronochromie (1959–1960)
- Arvo Pärt – Cantus in Memoriam Benjamin Britten (1977)
- Daron Hagen – Shining Brow (1993)

Multi-instrumentalist Mike Oldfield's first album Tubular Bells (which provided the musical theme for the 1973 film The Exorcist) came about when he discovered a set of tubular bells at The Manor Studio in Oxfordshire, England which had been used by John Cale, the previous musician that had recorded there.

== Pipe organ chimes ==
Pipe organs are often installed with tubular bells, called "Chimes," playable from the keyboards and sometimes pedals when the "Chimes" stop is drawn. These bells are struck by hammers triggered by either electric or pneumatic mechanisms when they receive an electrical signal from the console keyboards (although some mechanical mechanisms do exist).

== Other uses ==
Tubular bells can be used as church bells, such as at St. Alban's Anglican Church in Copenhagen, Denmark. These were donated by King Charles III (then Prince of Wales).

Tubular bells are also used in longcase clocks, particularly because they produce a louder sound than gongs and regular chime-rods and therefore could be heard more easily.

== See also ==
- Bell plate
- Tubaphone
- Wind chime
