= Slentho =

The slentho (also spelled slento) is a musical instrument of the gamelan. It is similar to the saron family of instruments, and would be its lowest member (pitched one octave below the saron demung). Like those instruments, it has (typically) seven keys in the same arrangement, over a resonator box, and is hit with a wooden mallet (tabuh). However, unlike the other sarons, the center of its keys have a boss similar to that of a bonang. The slentho usually has the same notes as the slenthem, but a brighter, louder sound.

The slentho is no longer a common instrument in the gamelan, having largely been replaced by the slenthem. It does, however, continue to be used in older sets of gamelan, in which it may be used in preference to the slenthem in gendhing bonang.
