= Siter =

Indonesian musical instrument used in Gamelan

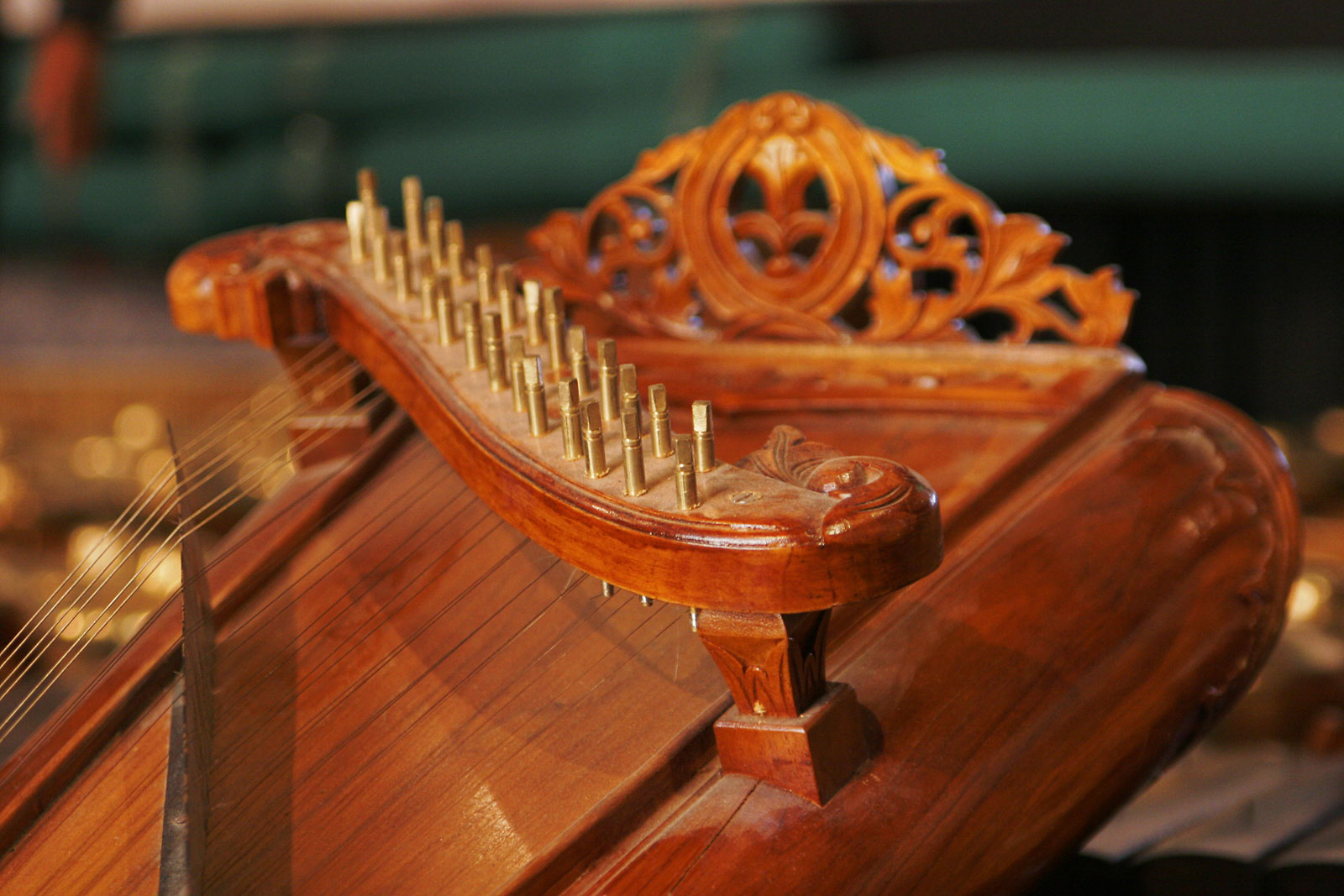
- Classification: String Instrument; Chordophone
- Developed: Indonesia

The Javanese siter and celempung are plucked string instruments used in Javanese gamelan. They are related to the kacapi used in Sundanese gamelan.

The siter and celempung each have between 11 and 13 pairs of strings, strung on each side, between a box resonator. Typically the strings on one side tuned to pélog and the other to slendro. The siter is generally about a foot long and fits in a box (which it is set upon while played), while the celempung is about three feet long and sits on four legs, and is tuned one octave below the siter. They are used as one of the elaborating instruments (panerusan), that play cengkok (melodic patterns based on the balungan). Both the siter and celempung play at the same speed as the gambang (which is rapidly).

The name "siter" comes from the Dutch word "citer", which corresponds to the English word "zither". "Celempung" is related to the Sundanese musical form celempungan. Not to be confused with Sundanese celempung is a different instrument, made of bamboo and played by beating the bamboo strings cut from the bamboo skin.

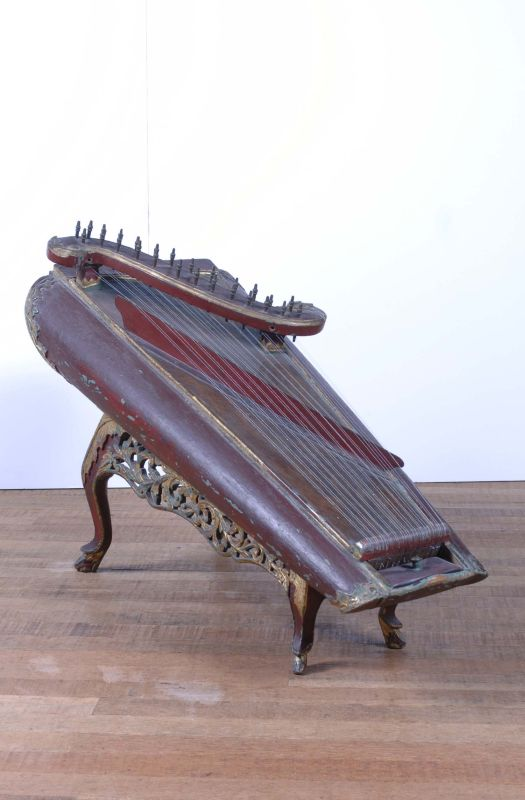
Celempung or siter in the collection of the Collection National Museum of World Cultures Foundation, Netherlands

The strings of the siter are played with the thumbnails, while the fingers are used to dampen the strings when the next one is hit, as is typical with instruments in the gamelan. The fingers of both hands are used for the damping, with the right hand below the strings and the left hand above them.

Siters and celempung of various sizes are the characteristic instrument in Gamelan Siteran, although they are used in many other varieties of gamelan as well.

== See also ==
- Kethuk
- Bonang
- Music of Indonesia
- Music of Java
