= Metallophone =

Musical instrument in which the sound-producing body is a piece of metal

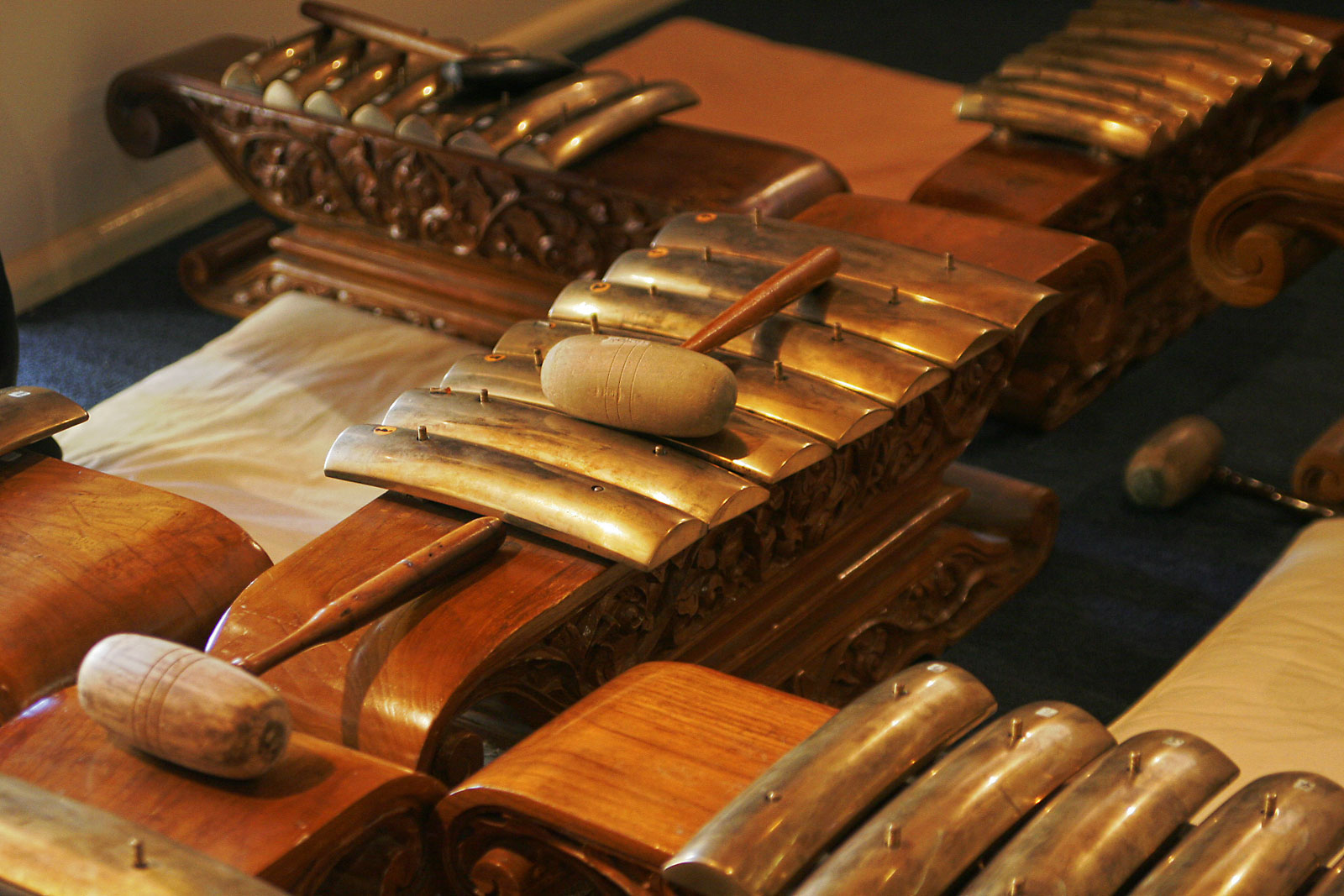
A metallophone used in a Gamelan—Indonesian Embassy in Canberra

A metallophone is any musical instrument in which the sound-producing body is a piece of metal (other than a metal string), such as tuned metal bars, tubes, rods, bowls, or plates. Most frequently the metal body is struck to produce sound, usually with a mallet, but may also be activated by friction, keyboard action, or other means.

Metallophones have been used in music in Asia for thousands of years. There are several different types used in Balinese and Javanese gamelan ensembles, including the gendèr, gangsa and saron. These instruments have a single row of bars, tuned to the distinctive pelog or slendro scales, or a subset of them. The Western glockenspiel and vibraphone are also metallophones: they have two rows of bars, in an imitation of the piano keyboard, and are tuned to the chromatic scale.

In music of the 20th century and beyond, the word metallophone is sometimes applied specifically to a single row of metal bars suspended over a resonator box. Metallophones tuned to the diatonic scale are often used in schools; Carl Orff used diatonic metallophones in several of his pieces, including his pedagogical Schulwerk. Metallophones with microtonal tunings are used in Iannis Xenakis' Pléïades and in the music of Harry Partch.

== Classification ==
Metallophones are a subset, made of metal, of Hornbostel-Sachs category 111.22 Percussion plaques, which is a subset of percussion idiophones.

== List of metallophones ==
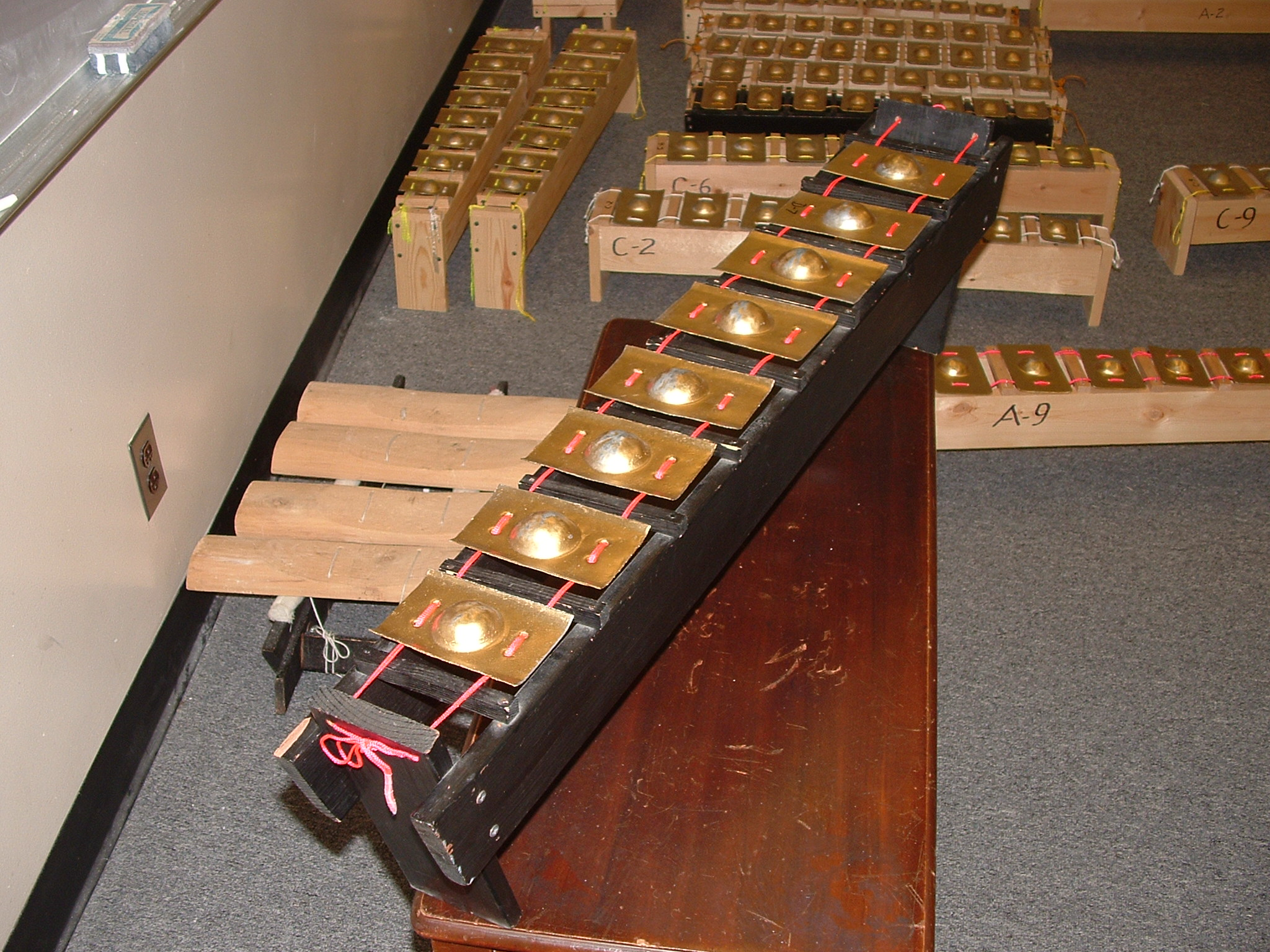
Kulintang a Tiniok: A Philippine metallophone

- Aluphone
- Bell
- Bell plate
- Bonang
- Cegléd water jug
- Celesta
- Chime bar
- Cowbells
- Crotales
- Dulcitone
- Fangxiang
- Gangsa
- Geger
- Gendèr
- Glockenspiel
- Gong
- Hand bells
- Handpan
- Jegogan
- Jublag
- Kulintang a Tiniok/Sarunay
- Mark tree
- Orff metallophones
- Ranat ek lek
- Ranat thum lek
- Rhodes piano
- Roneat dek
- Roneat thong
- Saron
- Slentem
- Step bell
- Steel marimbaphone
- Ugal
- Steel drum
- Tam-tam
- Toy piano
- Triangle
- Tubaphone
- Tubular bells
- Vibraphone
- Waterphone

== See also ==
- Aerophone
- Lithophone
- Xylophone
