= Pasindhèn =

Female solo singer who sings with a gamelan

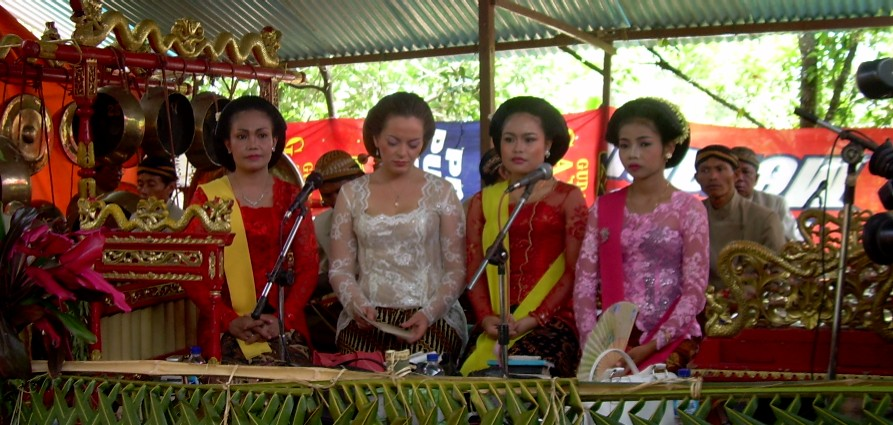
Pasindhen performance

A pasindhèn (Javanese: ꦥꦱꦶꦤ꧀ꦝꦺꦤ꧀, romanized: pasindhèn, pesindhèn) (informally ꦱꦶꦤ꧀ꦝꦺꦤ꧀ sindhèn) is an Indonesian female solo singer who sings with a gamelan. They may perform in dance, wayang or klenèngan (pure music or "concert") performances.

The pesindhèn may sing together with a gerong (male chorus), but their styles and words will be different. The part of the sindhèn is largely improvised within strict parameters (similar to instrumental cengkok). The sindhèn is also allowed a much freer rhythm, similar to the rebab and suling, instead of the strict rhythm of the gerong.

Sindhen can also refer to the choir of male and female singers used to accompany the bedhaya and serimpi court dances. In this usage, pesindhen refers to the individual members of the choir.

== History ==
The original term for pasindhèn was waranggana, and the women were exclusively background singers for wayang and klenèngan performances. This word was derived from ronggeng, which had undertones of lasciviousness, so in 1948 the most prominent gerong managers gathered and agreed to change it to pasindhèn. Along with this shift in terminology, the women took on more prominent roles in the troupes, and started to sing alone. The stage names of pasindhèn also changed, from pseudonymous birds' names to the women's actual names. Pesindhèn can now be highly paid, with star status, and the presence of a large number of pesindhèn in a wayang performance is a status symbol.

== See also ==
- Gamelan
- Gerongan
- Keplok
- Music of Java
