= Gamelan siteran =

Style of gamelan music

Gamelan siteran is a casual style of gamelan in Java, Indonesia, featuring portable, inexpensive instruments instead of the heavy bronze metallophones of a typical gamelan. A typical group consists of varieties of siter (small zither, which leads to the name), kendang (drum), and a large end-blown bamboo tube or a gong kemodhong, functioning as a gong ageng. A full group has a celempung, siter, siter panerus, siter slenthem, kendhang ciblon, and gong kemodhong. It is typically accompanied by singing as well. The instruments are often homemade, something which is impossible with the more characteristic gamelan instruments. Performances are usually of pieces from the standard Javanese gamelan repertoire.

== See also ==
- Gamelan
- Bonang
- Degung
