= Gamelan salendro =

Indonesian traditional musical instruments

Gamelan Salendro
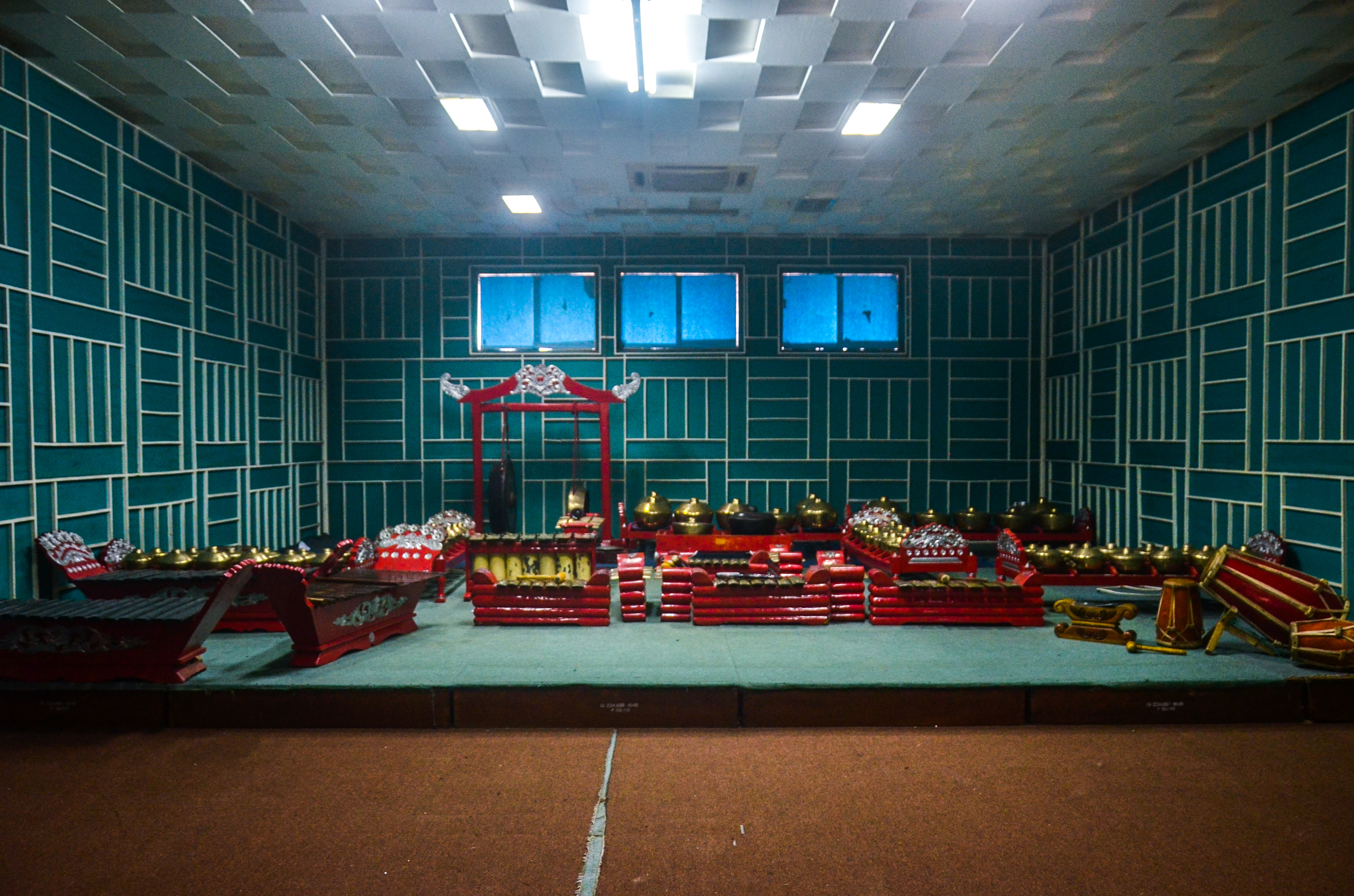
- Gamelan Salendro
- Developed: Indonesia

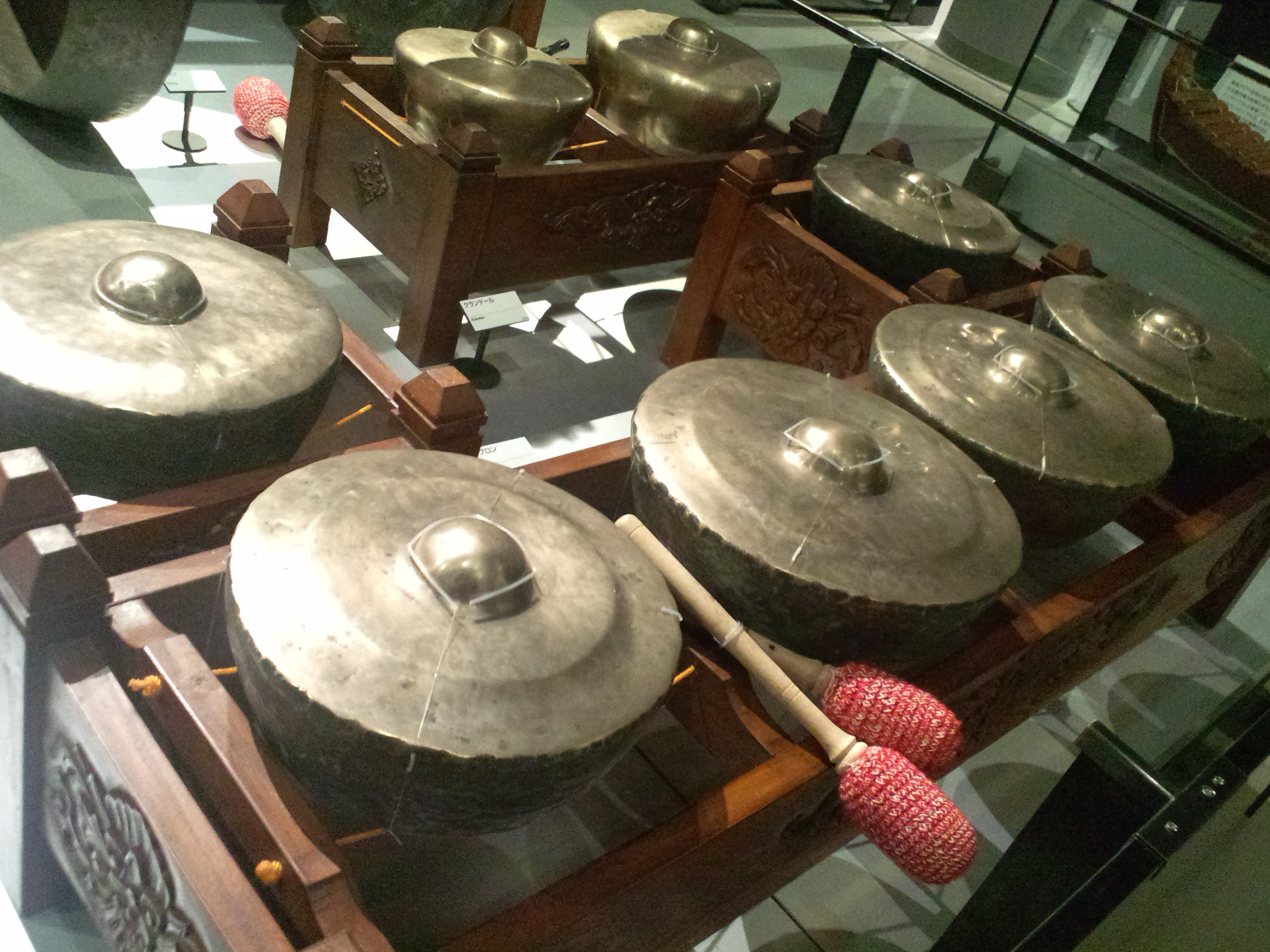
Gamelan salendro in National Museum of Ethnology, Osaka.

The gamelan salendro is a form of gamelan music found in West Java, Indonesia. It is played as an accompaniment to wayang golek (rod puppet) performances and dances. It uses a similar ensemble as a small central Javanese gamelan, but has developed differently, and shows the more exuberant character.

== See also ==
- Gamelan
- Degung
- Angklung
