= Gambang (instrument) =

Indonesian musical instrument used in Gamelan

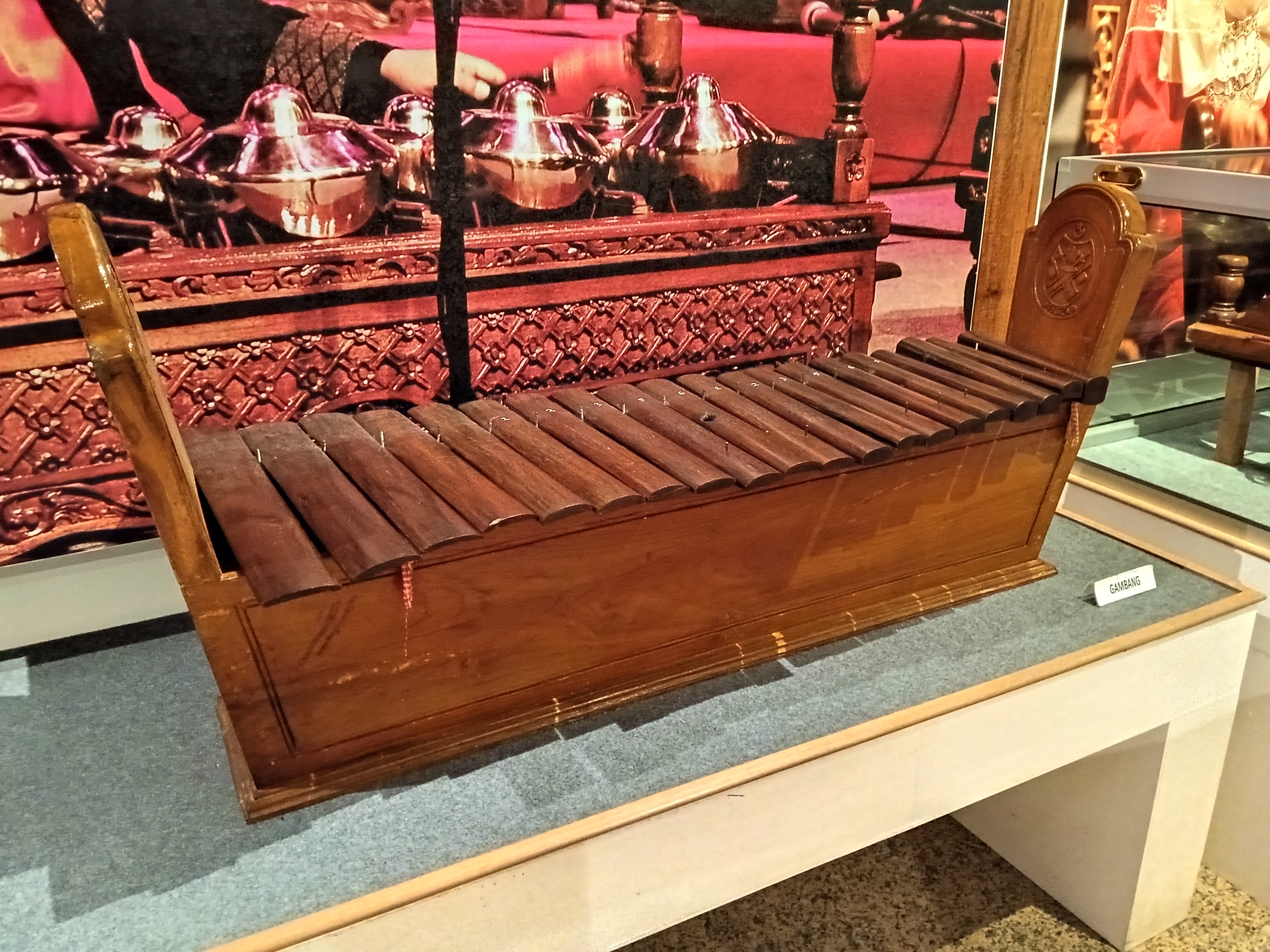
- Classification: Percussion instrument; Idiophone
- Developed: Indonesia

A gambang, properly called a gambang kayu ('wooden gambang') is a xylophone-like instrument used in Indonesian gamelan and kulintang ensembles. It has wooden bars (wilah) in contrast to the metallic ones of the more typical metallophones in a gamelan. A largely obsolete instrument, the gambang gangsa, is a similar instrument made with metal bars.

== Gambang kayu ==
The bars of the instrument are made of a hardwood, often teak though many other species are used: ironwood (kayu besi), merbau (Borneo teak), jackfruit, ramin, rawan, Artocarpus species, etc. The bars are mounted on a deep wooden case that serves as a resonator. Instruments typically have 17-21 keys that are easily removed, and are kept in place by having a hole through which a nail is placed. Generally a full gamelan has two sets, one gambang pelog and the other one gambang slendro.

A pair of long thin mallets (tabuh), made of flexible water buffalo horn tipped with felt, are used to play the instrument. Gambangs are generally played in parallel octaves (gembyang). Occasionally, other styles of playing are employed such as playing kempyung, i.e. two notes separated by two keys. Unlike most other gamelan instruments, no dampening is required, as the internal damping is much greater than in the metal keys of other instruments.

The gambang is used in a number of gamelan ensembles. It is most notable in the Balinese gamelan Gambang. In Javanese wayang, it is used by itself to accompany the dalang in certain chants. Within a full gamelan, it stands out somewhat because of the high speed of playing, its contrasting timbre due to its materials, and its comaparatively wide melodic range.

In Javanese gamelan, the gambang plays cengkok like the other elaborating instruments. However, the repertoire of cengkok for the gambang is more rudimentary than for other instruments (for instance, the gendér), and a great deal of variation is accepted.

== Gambang gangsa ==
The gambang gangsa has a similar construction, although it generally has fewer keys (typically 15) and is thus somewhat smaller. It has largely been replaced by the saron family of instruments. It was formerly thought to have been a forerunner of the one-octave saron, although more recent evidence, including the appearance of the saron in reliefs at Borobudur in the 9th century, indicate that the instruments are of the same age or that the one-octave saron is older.

In early 19th century writings on the Javanese gamelan, it seems to have been played like the gambang kayu; that is, as an elaborating instrument. Later, by 1890, it seems to have merely substituted for a saron, and have been restricted to a small range. Mantle Hood associated this use of limited range to a preference for certain octave arrangements of the cadences in various pathet.

== See also ==
- Gangsa
- Gabbang
