= Imbal =

Indonesian musical melody used in Gamelan

Imbal (Javanese for 'to repeat') or imbalan (imbal-imbalan, demung imbal) is a technique used in Indonesian Javanese gamelan. It refers to a rapid alternation of a melodic line between instruments, in a way similar to hocket in medieval music or kotekan in Balinese gamelan. "A style of playing in which two identical or similar instruments play interlocking parts forming a single repetitive melodic pattern."

This imbal is a method of playing in which the nuclear theme is played by one of the nyaga's 'broken up' into half-values (say, two crotchets [quarter notes] for every minim [half note]), what time another player beats alternately with the first, but in such a way that his tones, each of which comes between two of his colleague's, are always one step lower than the nuclear theme tone immediately preceding it. From practical considerations this imbal is, if possible, divided over two demungs; if only one such instrument is available, the two players sit facing each other. The player who beats the nuclear theme tones is said to play the gawé (...); the other one, the nginţil (= inseparable, following like a shadow) (...).

— Jaap Kunst

In Javanese gamelan, it is used especially for the sarons and the bonangs. On the bonangs, an imbal pattern is divided between the bonang panerus and bonang barung, in the octave or so of range that both instruments have. When played on sarons, generally two of the same instrument are used. Both bonang and saron patterns generally are made of scalar passages that end on the seleh at the end of the gatra. Each key is dampened as soon as the other instrument plays, and it allows the melody to be played faster or more smoothly than is possible by a single performer. "Basically, there are two bonang-playing techniques: imbal-imbalan and pipilan. Imbal-imbalan (interlocking) refers to the playing technique in which bonang barung and bonang panerus play interlocking patterns."

One of the hallmarks of Yogyanese style, especially suited to the performance of loud-playing pieces, is the interlocking alternation of two demung parts, known as imbal demung. ... Imbal is a widely practiced technique, popular in some Solonese genres and throughout Java.

On the bonangs, an imbal passage is usually followed by a sekaran.

== See also ==
- Gamelan
- Panerusan
- kotekan
- Gatra
- Gendhing structures
- Music of Indonesia
- Music of Java
