= Tubaphone =

Musical instrument

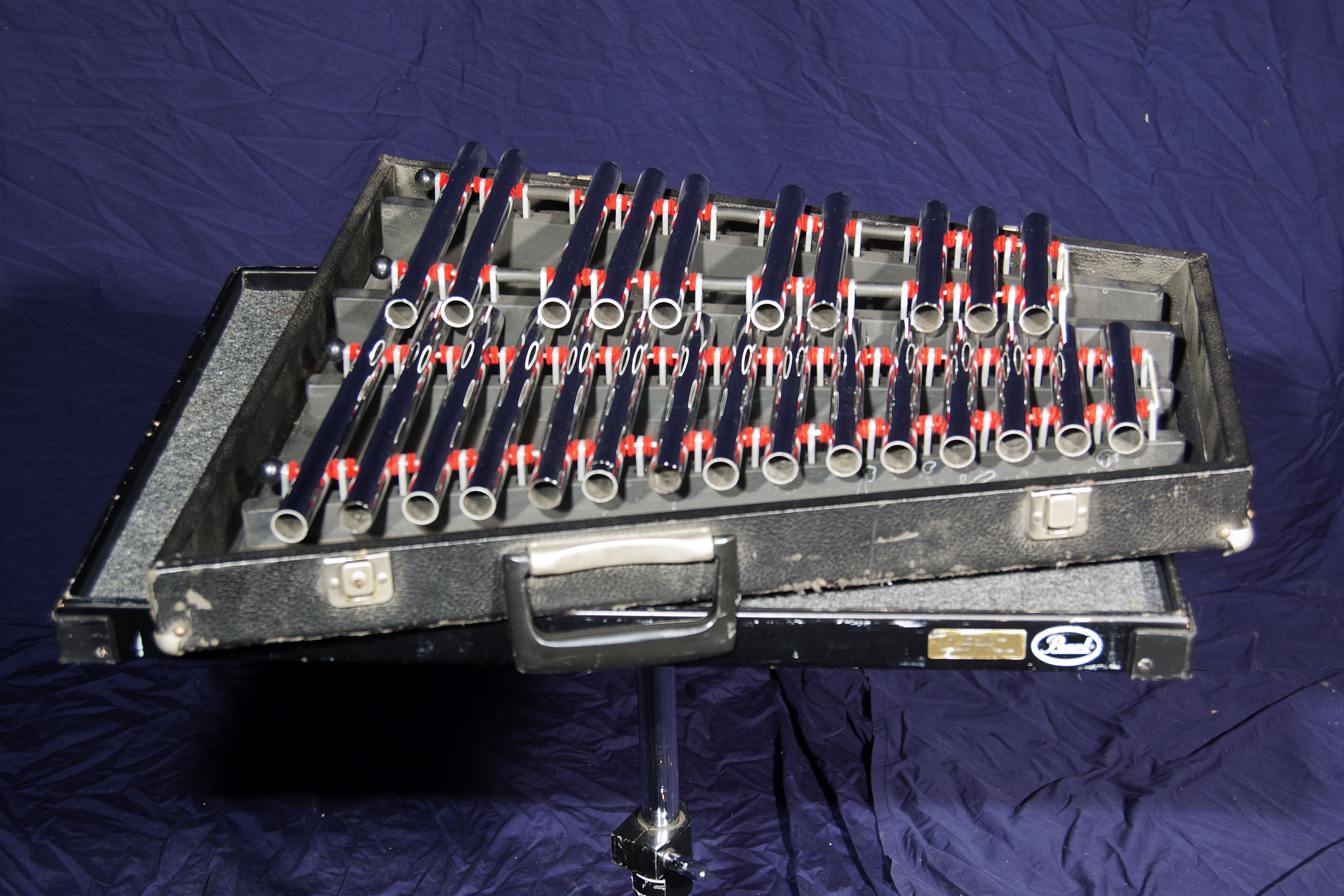

Percussion instrument
- Other names: Tubaphon; Tubophone; Tubuscampanophon
- Classification: Keyboard percussion
- Hornbostel–Sachs classification: 111.232 (Sets of percussion tubes)

Playing range
- C_{6}–C_{8}

Builders
- J.C. Deagan Company

A tubaphone is a type of metallophone constructed from a series of metal tubes arranged in a keyboard configuration. The tubes are similar in length to that of a xylophone, and sound vaguely like a glockenspiel.
