= Slenthem =

Indonesian musical instrument used in Gamelan

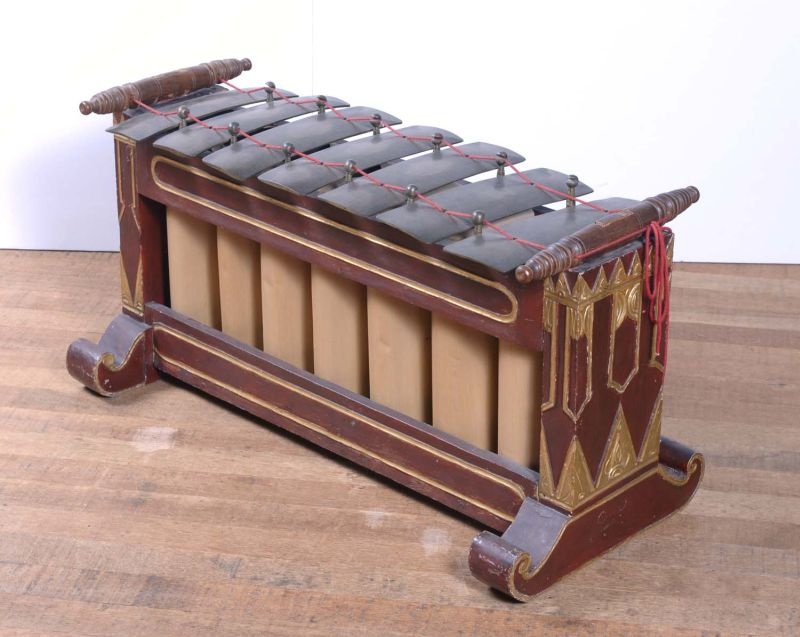
- Classification: Percussion instrument; Idiophone
- Developed: Indonesia

The slenthem (also slentem or gender panembung) is an Indonesian metallophone which makes up part of a Javanese gamelan orchestra. The slenthem is part of the gendér family. It consists of a set of bronze keys comprising a single octave: there are six keys when playing the slendro scale and seven when playing the pelog. These keys are suspended by leather cords over individual bamboo tube resonators in a wooden frame, which are cut so that the placement of the bamboo's node causes the functional length of the resonator to be shorter for higher notes. The instrument is played by striking the keys with a mallet, called a tabuh, which has a short handle and a thin wooden disk edged in cloth or rubber. One hand is left free to dampen notes. It is a low-pitched instrument with a softer sound than the saron demung.

Like the saron barung and demung, it generally plays the most basic form of the melody (balungan) in a composition. However it also sometimes uses techniques similar to the saron to elaborate. It is especially favored in quieter gamelan ensembles (such as Gamelan Gadhon); but it is a part of standard Gamelan Gedhé as the only soft-style instrument also played in loud-style pieces.

It is typically placed among the instruments at the front of the performing area.

== See also ==
- Gamelan
- Kenong
- Saron
- Bonang
- Gong
- Music of Java
