= Gerong =

Type of gamelan chorus

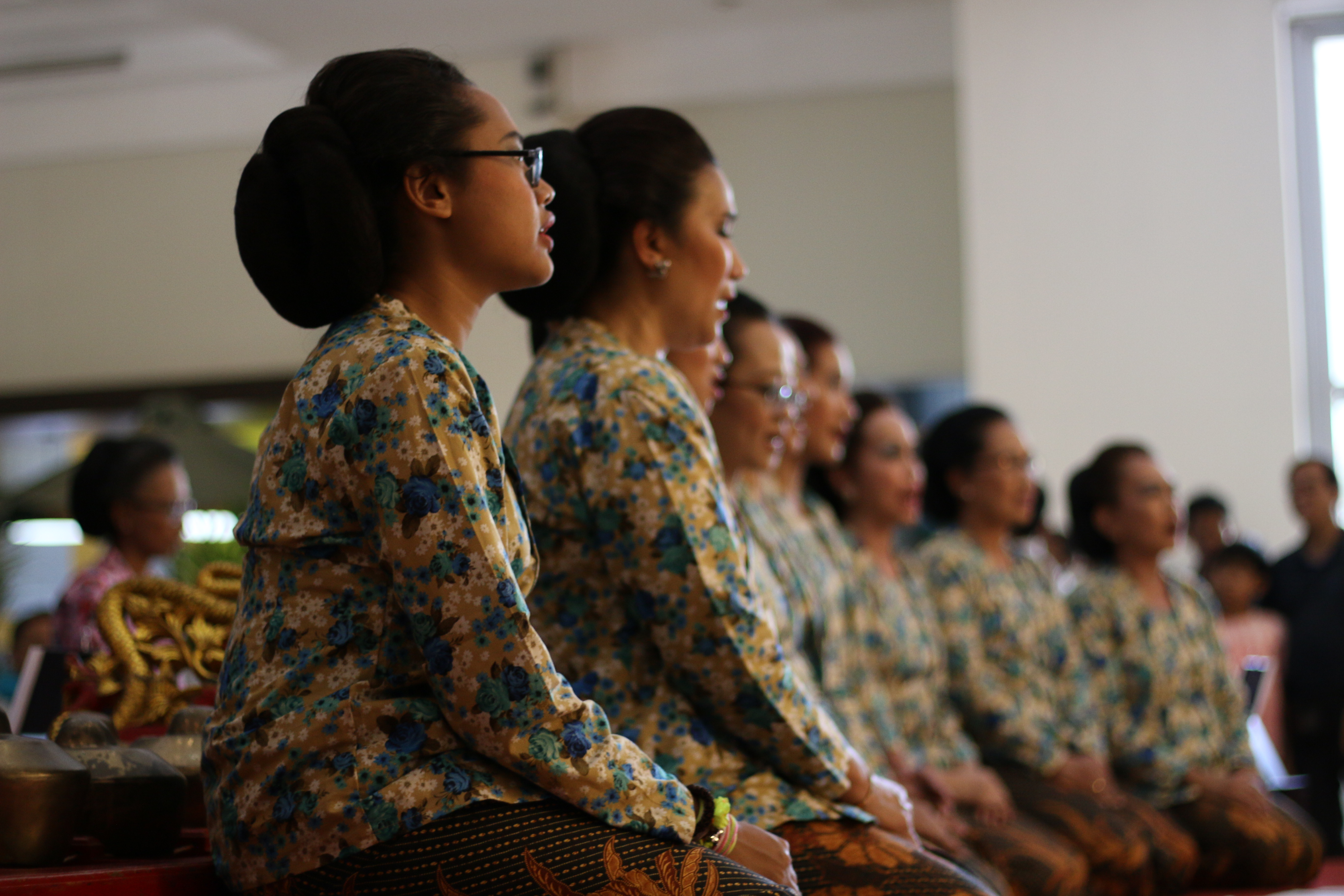
Gerong performance

Gerong (Javanese: ꦒꦼꦫꦺꦴꦁ, romanized: gerong) is the Javanese verb meaning "to sing in a chorus." Penggerong is the proper name of a member of the chorus, but often the word gerong is used to refer to the unison male chorus that sings with the gamelan. The chorus or the melody may also be called the gerongan.

The gerong generally sings in distinct sections of a gamelan composition. Certain standard texts in Javanese poetic meters of various structures are used in many compositions; some are based in Javanese poetic forms known as macapat. Some pieces have specific texts written for them, but this is often a special treatment. Female singers are referred to as pesindhen, and may sing in a separate group, a combined group with the men, or as a solo female voice, with or without a male chorus.

A gerong part is different from that of a single female singer sindhen, in that the chorus must sing together, and is generally more connected to the steady pulse of the underlying gamelan parts. While vocal parts for both male and female singers can be notated in the cipher or number notation called kepatihan notation, the actual realization of these parts will always be open to stylistic and other variations.

The noted Javanese musician K. P. H. Notoprojo (known to his students as Pak Cokro) wrote out vocal notation for many pieces. These are now on line in the library of the American Gamelan Institute.

== See also ==
- Gamelan
- Pesinden
- Keplok
- Music of Java
