= Saron (instrument) =

Indonesian musical instrument used in Gamelan

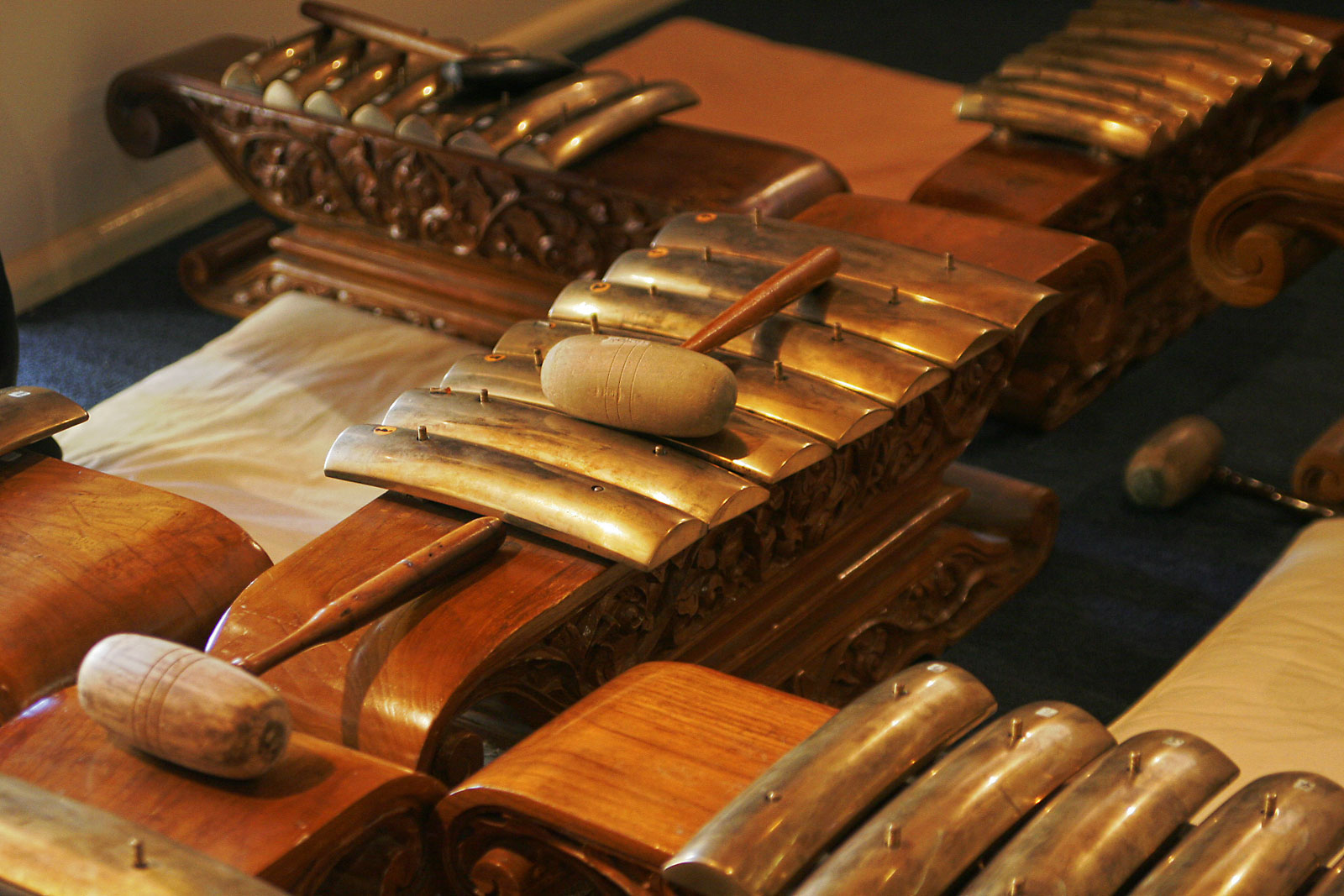
- Classification: Percussion instrument; Idiophone; Metallophone
- Developed: Indonesia

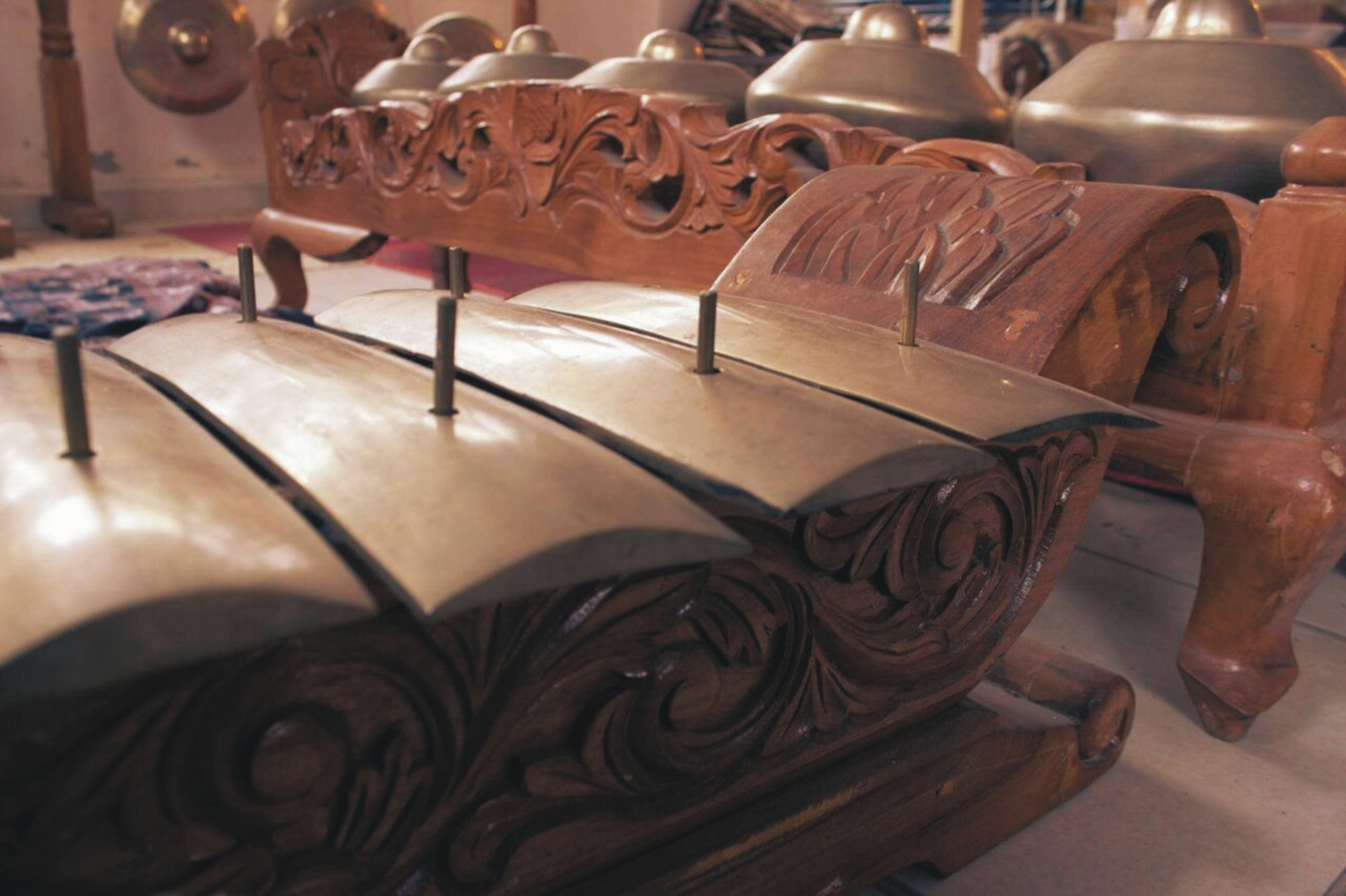
saron gamelan degung barudak Indra Swara Mexico

The saron is a musical instrument of Indonesia, which is used in the gamelan. It normally has seven bronze bars placed on top of a resonating frame (rancak). It is usually about 20 cm (8 in) high, and is played on the floor by a seated performer. In a pelog scale, the bars often read 1-2-3-5-6-7 across (the number four is not used because of its relation to death) (in kepatihan numbering); for slendro, the bars are 6-1-2-3-5-6-1; this can vary from gamelan to gamelan, or even among instruments in the same gamelan. Slendro instruments commonly have only six keys. It provides the core melody (balungan) in the gamelan orchestra.

== Varieties ==
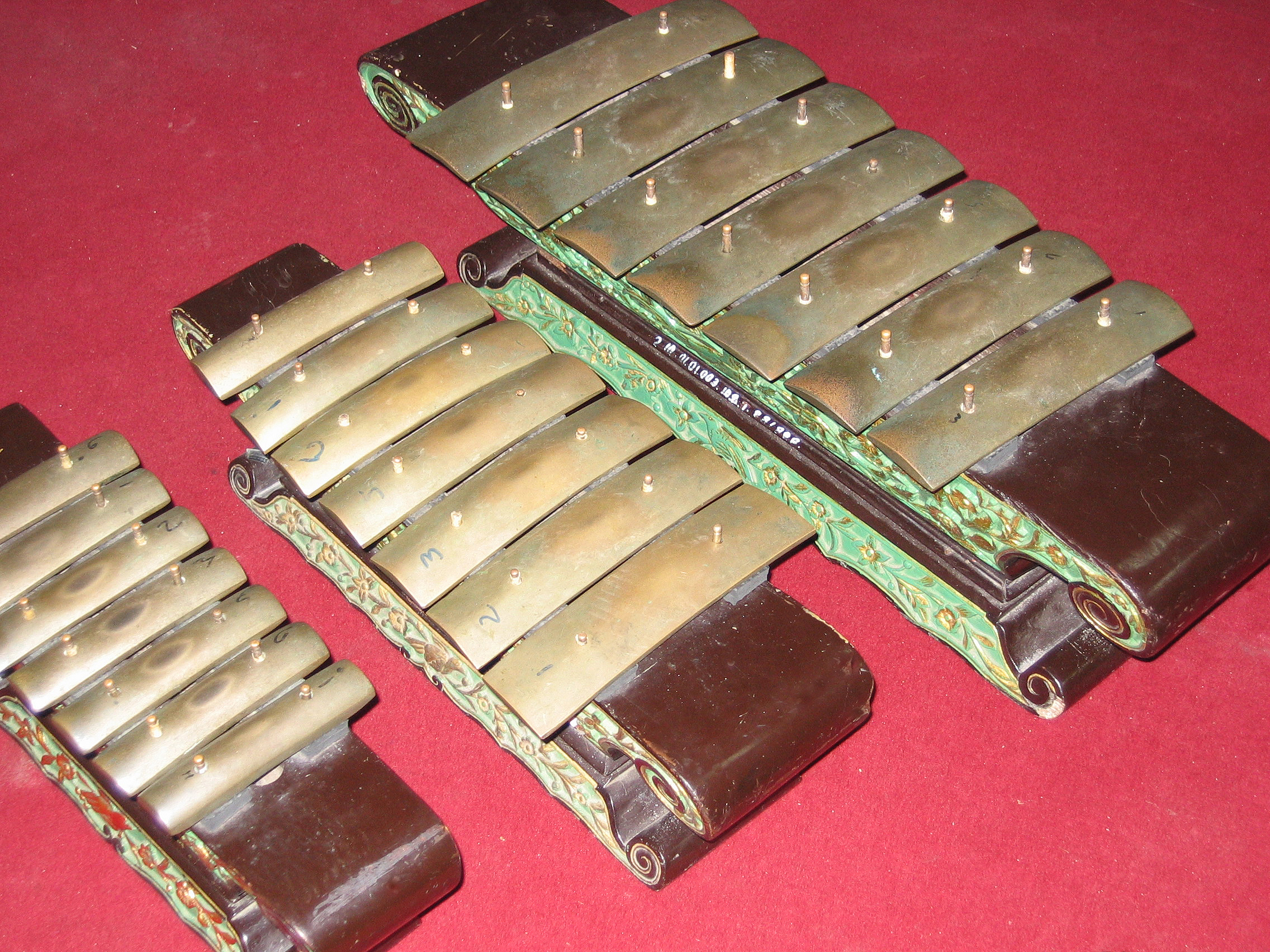
From left to right, saron panerus, saron barung, and demung, from STSI Surakarta

Sarons typically come in a number often sizes, from smallest to largest:

- Saron panerus (also: peking)
- Saron barung (sometimes just saron)
- Saron demung (often just called demung)

Each one of those is pitched an octave below the previous. The slenthem or slentho performs a similar function to the sarons one octave below the demung.

== Playing techniques ==
The sarons are struck with a mallet (tabuh). Typically the striking mallet is angled to the right to produce a fuller sound. Demung and saron barung generally use a wooden mallet, while the peking mallet is made of a water buffalo horn, which gives it a shriller sound. The other hand is used to dampen the previous note by grasping the key, in order to prevent a muddy sound. On repeated notes, the note is usually dampened half a beat before it is struck again.

The saron barung and demung usually play less often and more simple parts. These are the usual techniques for playing them:

- Mbalung: playing the balungan melody as notated, without elaboration
- Tabuhan pinjalan: playing an interlocking pinjalan pattern between the saron barung, demung, and slenthem, which fills in the offbeats of the balungan
- Tabuhan imbal: playing an interlocking imbal pattern between two of the same instruments, usually either saron barung or demung. Note that the dampening must happen as soon as the other performer plays a note; this is usually twice as soon as when playing by oneself.
- Pancer: sometimes a note is added between balungan notes if there is a great deal of space between them (i.e., it is in a slow irama). This is called a pancer.

Saron panerus has distinctive patterns which make it different from the other sarons. It usually plays more often, and keeps a constant beat going throughout a piece. Its playing techniques include:

- Nacah lamba: playing the balungan (with repeated notes if necessary, depending on the irama)
- Nacah selang-seling: playing the balungan in pairs of notes (which may be repeated), making a more elaborate variation on the phrase
- Imbal-imbalan: similar to tabuhan imbal for the other sarons

== History ==
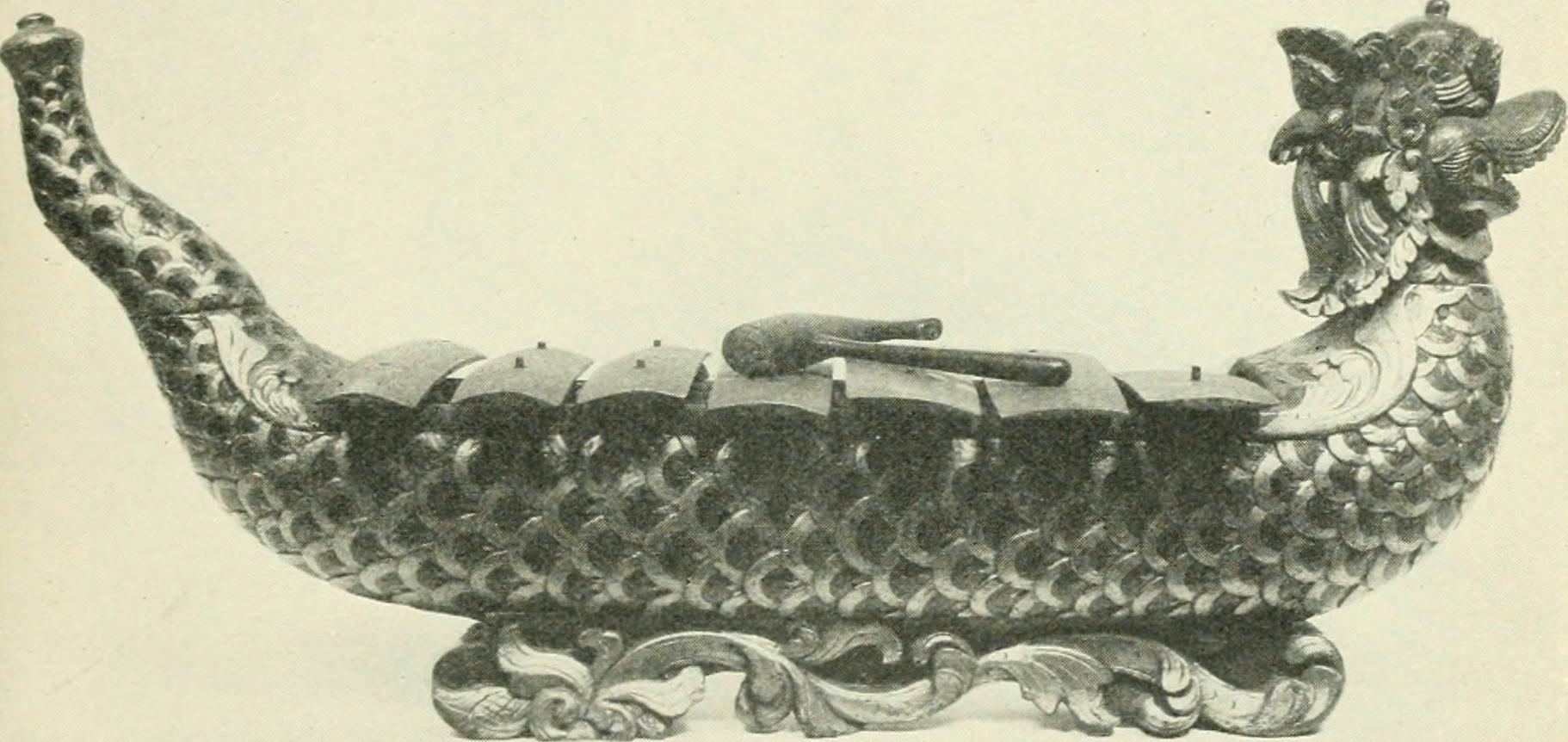
Saron (c. 1800-1850) brought back from Indonesia or Java to England by Stamford Raffles.

The earliest known appearance of a single-octave saron is in a relief at Borobudur, from the 9th century. It was formerly supposed that the saron derived from the decomposition of the gambang gangsa, after it fell out of use. Mantle Hood rejected this hypothesis, and associates the preference for a single octave with the characteristic shape of the cadence in the pathet. There is no evidence that the gambang gangsa is older than the saron; indeed, it may be younger.

== See also ==
- Gamelan
- Slentho
- Slentem
- Bonang panerus
- Music of Indonesia
- Music of Java
