= Cengkok =

Indonesian musical melody used in Gamelan

Céngkok (Javanese: ꦕꦺꦁꦏꦺꦴꦏ꧀, romanized: Céngkok) (old orthography: tjengkok) are patterns played by the elaborating instruments used in Indonesian Javanese gamelan. They are melodic formula that lead to a sèlèh, following the rules of the pathet of the piece.

The most elaborate cengkok repertoire is that of the gendér barung. The gambang and siter, on the other hand, do not have such formalized sets of cengkok, and therefore may vary more from performer to performer.

Most cengkok derive from the vocal repertoire, and many have names that originally came from lyrics, like the well-known "Ayu kuning". They may incorporate pre-existent melodic patterns through a process of centonization.

== See also ==
- Gamelan
- Seleh
- Sekaran
- Pathet
- Music of Indonesia
- Music of Java
