= Slendro =

Indonesian musical pentatonic scale used in Gamelan

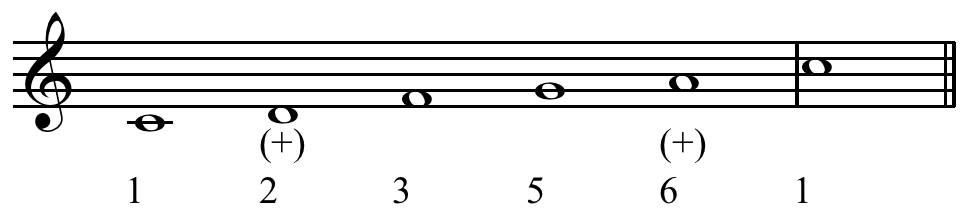
Slendro approximated in Western notation.

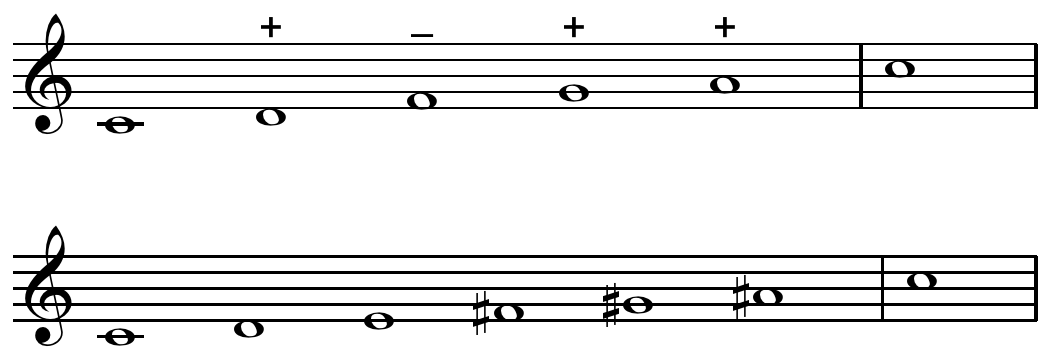
Slendro-djawar scale in comparison with whole tone scale on C or.

Play both slendro and whole tone scale
-

Slendro (Javanese: ꦱ꧀ꦭꦺꦤ꧀ꦢꦿꦺꦴ) is one of the essential tuning systems used in gamelan instruments that have pentatonic scale. Based on Javanese mythology, the Slendro Gamelan tuning system is older than the pélog tuning system.

== Etymology ==
Slendro is a Javanese term for one of the scales in gamelan. It is derived either from "Sailendra", the name of the ruling family in the eighth and ninth centuries when Borobudur was built, or from the god Sang Hyang Hendra.

== History ==
The origin of the slendro scale is unknown. It is thought to be brought to Srivijaya by Mahayana Buddhists from Gandhara of India, via Nalanda and Srivijaya from there to Java and Bali. It is similar to scales used in Indian and Chinese music as well as other areas of Asia and they all may have a common origin. A salendro scale is also found in the neighboring musical ensemble of Kulintang. This is very difficult if not impossible to determine.

Even within Indonesia, it is difficult to determine the evolution of scales. For example, scales used in Banyuwangi, at the eastern tip of Java, are very similar to scales used in Jembrana, a short distance away on Bali. There is probably no way to document which region influenced the other, or if they both evolved together.

== Tuning ==
From one region of Indonesia to another the slendro scale often varies widely. The amount of variation also varies from region to region. For example, slendro in Central Java varies much less from gamelan to gamelan than it does in Bali, where ensembles from the same village may be tuned very differently. The five pitches of the Javanese version are roughly equally spaced within the octave.

As in pelog, although the intervals vary from one gamelan to the next, the intervals between notes in a scale are very close to identical for different instruments within the same gamelan. It is common in Balinese gamelan that instruments are played in pairs which are tuned slightly apart so as to produce interference beating which are ideally at a consistent speed for all pairs of notes in all registers. It is thought that this contributes to the very "busy" and "shimmering" sound of gamelan ensembles. In the religious ceremonies that contain gamelan, these interference beats are meant to give the listener a feeling of a god's presence or a stepping stone to a meditative state.

For the instruments that do not need fixed pitches (such as suling and rebab) and the voice, other pitches are sometimes inserted into the scale. The Sundanese musicologist/teacher Raden Machjar Angga Koesoemadinata identified 17 vocal pitches used in slendro. These microtonal adjustments bear some similarity to Indian śruti.

== Note names ==
In Java, the notes of the slendro scale can be designated in different ways; one common way is the use of numbers often called by their names in Javanese, especially in a shortened form. An older set uses names derived from parts of the body. Notice that both systems have the same designations for 5 and 6. There is no 4; possibly this is because it appears as an unusual tone in pelog and is not used when modulating between the systems.

Number	Javanese number		Traditional name	
	Full name	Short name	Full name	Literal meaning
1	siji	ji	panunggal	head
2	loro	ro	gulu	neck
3	telu	lu	dhadha	chest
5	lima	ma	lima	hand (five fingers)
6	enam	nam	nem	six

The name barang is also sometimes used for 1 in slendro (it is the usual name for 7 in pelog); the octave is then designated as barang alit.

In Bali, the scale starts on the note named ding, and then continue going up the scale to dong, deng, dung and dang.

== Connotations ==
For experienced participants in gamelan music, the pelog and slendro scales each have a particular feeling, related to the rituals and circumstances in which the scale is used. For example, in Bali, slendro is felt to have a sad sound because it is used as the tuning of gamelan angklung, the traditional ensemble for cremation ceremonies.

The connotation also depends on the pathet (roughly, the mode) used. There are three slendro pathet used in Javanese gamelan, nem, sanga, and manyura. That is the order in which they appear in a wayang performance, which historically used only slendro pathet. Consequently, they have the implications of where they appear in the evening.

== See also ==
- Gamelan
- Pathet
- Cengkok
- Pelog
- Music of Indonesia
- Music of Java
