= Bedhaya =

Indonesian sacred dance

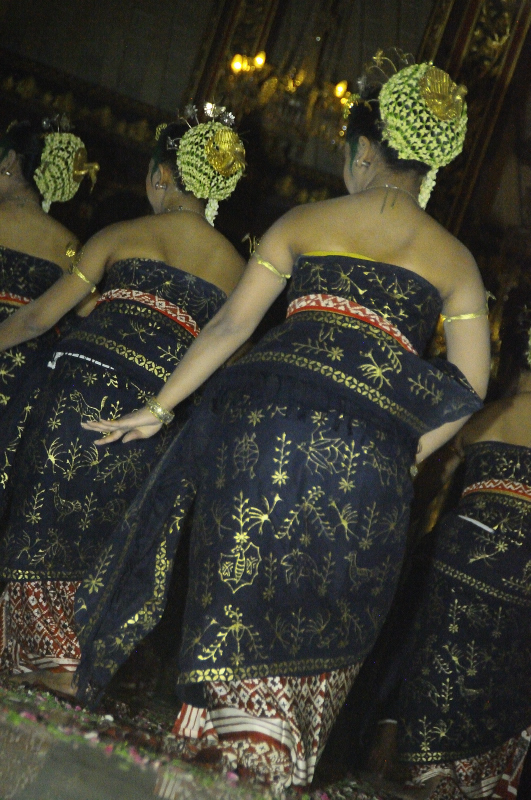
- The sacred dance of Bedhaya Ketawang
- Native name: Javanese: ꦧꦼꦝꦪ, romanized: bedhaya
- Genre: Traditional dance
- Instrument: Gamelan
- Inventor: Javanese
- Origin: Indonesia

The bedhaya (also written as bedoyo, beḍaya and various other transliterations) (Javanese: ꦧꦼꦝꦪ, romanized: Bedhaya) is a sacred, ritualised Javanese dance of Java, Indonesia, associated with the royal palaces of Yogyakarta and Surakarta. Along with the srimpi, the bedhaya epitomized the elegant (Javanese: ꦲꦭꦸꦱ꧀, romanized: alus) character of the royal court and became an important symbol of the ruler's power.

The bedhaya has different forms in the two court cities, the bedhaya Ketawang in Surakarta (Solo) and the bedhaya Semang in Yogyakarta, the latter of which has not been performed for more than 20 years. The Solonese dance continues to be performed once per year on the second day of the Javanese month of Ruwah (May), to commemorate the ascension of the current Susuhunan (prince) of Surakarta. Nine females, relatives or wives of the Susuhunan, dance with a private audience. An invitation to anyone outside of the inner circle of the court is a considerable honor.

== History ==
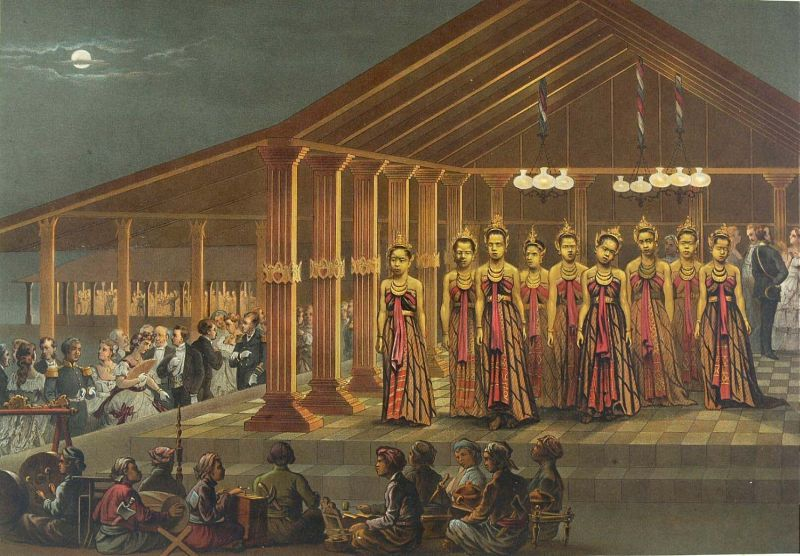
The court of the Sultan of Yogyakarta, c. 1876

Some kind of female dance known as bedhaya existed on Java at least as early as the Majapahit Empire. Indeed, some of the steps of the modern dance are said to be as old as the third century. However, the modern form is traditionally dated to the court of Sultan Agung of Mataram (reigned 1613–1645). Unfortunately, there is almost no historical evidence to back up the claims made about the advances in the arts in Sultan Agung's courts, and the existence of the dance was not clearly documented until the late 18th century.

There are many myths which explain the origin of the dance, which generally have either an account of a meeting with a Hindu deity (Shiva, Brahma, Vishnu, Indra, or Lord Buddha), or the meeting of Kangjeng Ratu Kidul, the Goddess of the South Sea, with a founder of the Mataram dynasty, either Sultan Ageng or his grandfather, Senapati. In the former, the nine dancers were the creation of a deity who was brought to life and offered the dance to their maker in gratitude. In the latter, the dance was created when Kangjeng Ratu Kidul fell in love with the sultan and danced the bedhaya for him; the nine dancers in the modern dance represent the spirit of the goddess.

Since the decline in the power of the royal courts, other, more accessible forms of bedhaya have become popular, not as religious ritual, but as artistic performance. These do not require the royal presence and may be performed on stage for an admission fee. They frequently recount stories used in wayang.

== Dance ==
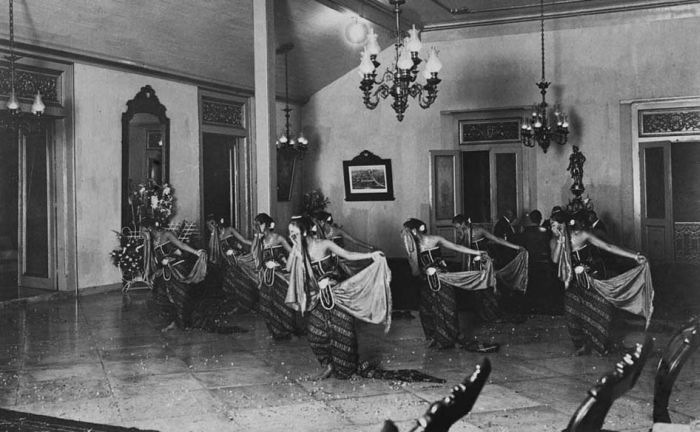
Bedhaya dance performance at the wedding of Hoesein Djajadiningrat and Partini in the palace of Prang Wedono (Mangkoe Negoro VII), the father of the bride, at Solo, Java, in January 1921

The dance is held in a pendhapa, a pillared audience hall with a peaked roof, with the Susuhunan on a throne in the middle of the room. The dance is performed in three large sections. In each section, the dancers emerge from a room behind the audience hall, approach the throne single file, dance in front of the throne, and then retreat, again single file. They approach and retreat on opposite sides of the throne, thus circumambulating the throne in a clockwise direction, the appropriate direction for veneration in Buddhist and Shaivist traditions.

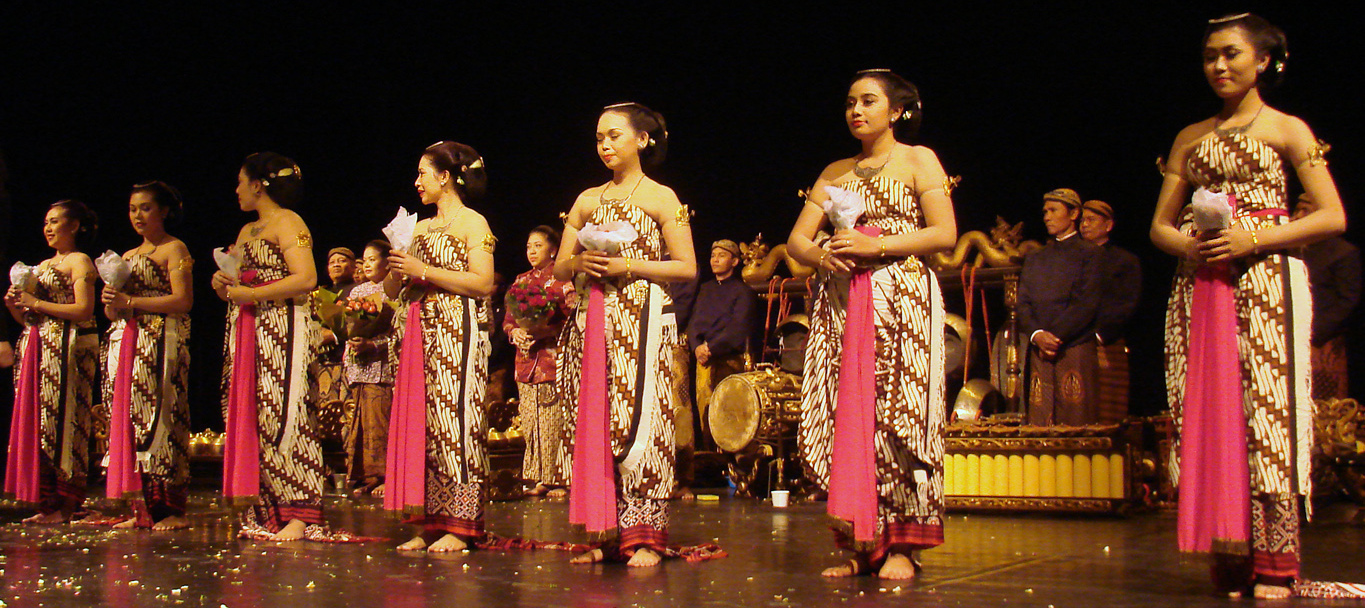
Bedhaya dancers from Solo wearing batik

A name and number is given to each of the nine dancers, which designates a specific position in the changing choreographic pattern. There are slight variations between different sources in the names and numbers of the dancers, but there is consensus on the general forms. They are: a human being, representing taṇhā (the word for desire or craving in Buddhism), four chakras (the top three of which are used as note names; see slendro), and the four limbs:

1. èndhèl/èndhèl ajeg, "desire", "constant/fixed desire", "attachment"
2. pembatak/batak, "head", "mind"
3. gulu/jangga, "neck"
4. dhadha, "chest"
5. buncit/bunthil, "tail", "genitals", "lower end of spinal column"
6. apit ngajeng/apit ngarep, "right arm", "right flank", "front flank"
7. apit wingking/apit mburi, "left arm", "rear flank"
8. èndhèl weton/èndhèl wedalan ngajeng/èndhèl jawi, "right leg", "emergent desire", "front emergent desire", "outside desire"
9. apit meneng/èndhèl wedalan wingking, "left leg", "quiet flank", "rear emergent desire"

The first two sections of the dance each have three positions, with slight variations, while the last adds a final, fourth position. The first position is in the shape of a human being, with the first five dancers in a line down the middle, and those representing the right and left sides in front and behind (from the perspective of the Susuhunan), respectively. In the second position, the dancers divide into two facing groups, the arms and desire to one side, and the chakras and legs on the other. In the third section of the dance, there is an added section of an encounter between the desire and head dancers in the second position, while the other dancers squat. The third position places the dancers either in a row (Surakarta) or with the arms to one side (Yogyakarta), with desire in the middle. The final position is in a 3x3 grid (rakit tiga-tiga), with the three upper chakra centers in the middle column.

== Music and text ==
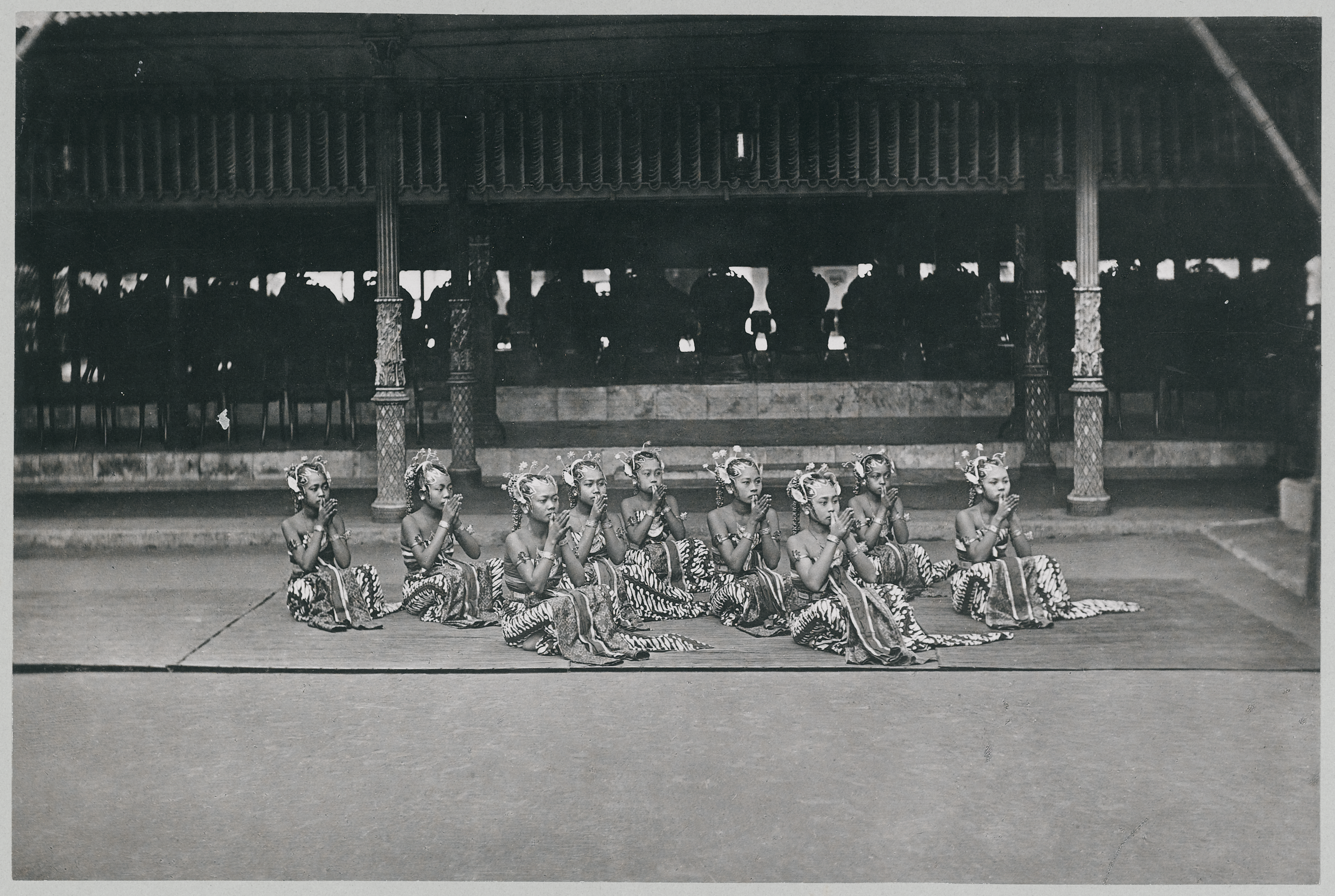
The bedhaya dancers doing a sembah (tribute) to the Sultan of Yogyakarta in 1884

The dance is accompanied by the singing of men and women together. The style is known as sindhenan lampah sekar. Formerly, only women sang; however, since at least the 1940s, men have also sung these parts. In Surakarta, instead of a full gamelan, the only instruments used are the colotomic instruments (kethuk, kenong, and gong), the kemanak, and drums (kendhang ketipung and gendhing); there are no balungan instruments and only sometimes other melodic instruments (such as gambang and gendér). In the Yogyakarta kraton, where the dance is no longer performed as ritual, the complete gamelan was used as accompaniment, sometimes even featuring cornets.

The pieces used to accompany the dances are traditionally gendhing with long structures (originally designated at least kethuk 4 arang; see gendhing for an explanation); however, shorter gendhings were also used later (such as kethuk 4 kerep or kethuk 2). The most ancient and sacred song is the Bedhaya Ketawang. When the bedhaya dancers appear on stage, in Yogyakarta, it is accompanied by an ayak-ayakan; in Surakarta, it is only accompanied by a pathetan known as pathetan bedhaya, which has lost much of the rhythmic freedom associated with pathetans to fit better the stride of the dancers.

The literary renaissance of Java in the 18th and 19th centuries, which greatly changed Javanese music, had as one of its first effects the creation of genres of gendhing to accompany bedhaya and serimpi, known as gendhing kemanak and gendhing bedhaya-serimpi. The former were based on a newly composed choral melody, while the latter fitted a new choral part into a pre-existing gendhing melody played by the gamelan. Hundreds of stanzas of text were written for these parts, and a particular gendhing uses at least a dozen. The texts are mainly in the form of a wangsalan (poetic riddle), and deal with a wide variety of subjects. Much of the text is erotic love poetry, describing the attraction of Kangjeng Ratu Kidul to Sultan Agung.

== Taboos ==
There are many taboos regarding the performance and rehearsal of the Bedhaya ketawang, both the song and the dance associated with it. It is only allowed to be rehearsed every 35 days (when Thursday of the seven-day week coincides with Kliwon, the fifth day of the five-day week of the Javanese calendar), and performed on the anniversaries of the Susuhunan's accession to the throne. All rehearsals, and especially the performance, must be accompanied by offerings (many of which correspond to those specified in the Gandavyuha Sutra). The dancers must fast and undergo ritual purification; they must be in bridal dress and cover the upper part of their bodies in turmeric (borèh). When the text is copied, a few intentional mistakes are inserted to avoid copying a sacred text literally. This is all because during any performance or rehearsal, the deputies of Ratu Kidul are said to be present.

== Interpretation ==
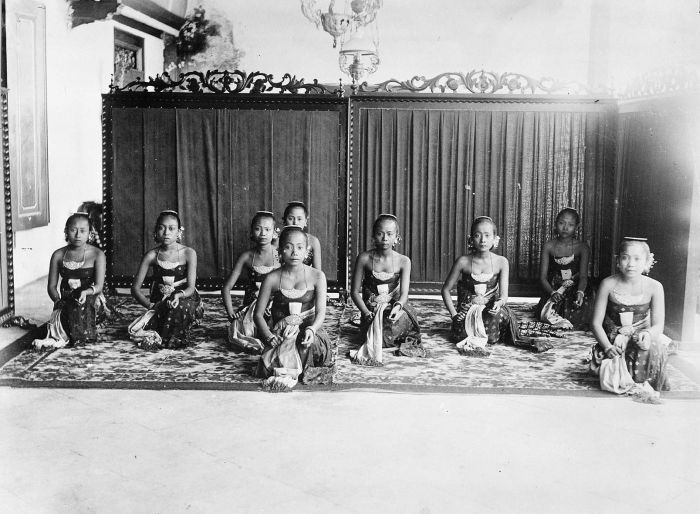
The Bedoyo dancers at the Susuhunan Palace Solo, Surakarta, between 1910 and 1930

The dance can be interpreted in a number of ways, including as an abstract sequence of positions, and a reenactment of the love between the goddess and a royal ancestor. Another common interpretation is that they symbolize military formations, which may explain why the dancers are given names of flanks. Furthermore, the dancers were brought onto battlefields with the Yogyakartan ruler. Some of the choreographic positions are vaguely similar to those that were believed to have been used in the Kurukshetra War, the war in the Mahabharata, and some of the texts tell of military victories.

Judith Becker provides a tantric interpretation. The first position shows desire plus the body; the second shows opposition between desire and the chakras (there is some evidence that the legs were considered a fifth chakra), and in the final section, interaction between the head and desire. Afterwards, desire is absorbed into the body, and then the dancers are arranged in the same arrangement as offerings in the Majapahit palace. Three is a number rich in Hindu symbolism, like the three pramanas, the Trilokya or the Trimurti, so a threefold set of three symbolizes completion and perfection.

In the 19th century, dancers held and fired pistols in the performance of the bedhaya. Sumarsam considered the meaning of the use of pistols an aristocratic attempt to adopt a foreign element to show enhance royal power, or the secularization and informalization of the court ritual when in the presence of European guests.

During some period in the 19th century, the dancers in Yogyakarta were young men dressed as women. The combination of characteristics of both sexes was thought to have a special spiritual power.

== See also ==
- Srimpi
- Javanese culture
- Kejawèn
- Nyai Roro Kidul
