= Gendèr =

Indonesian musical instrument used in Gamelan

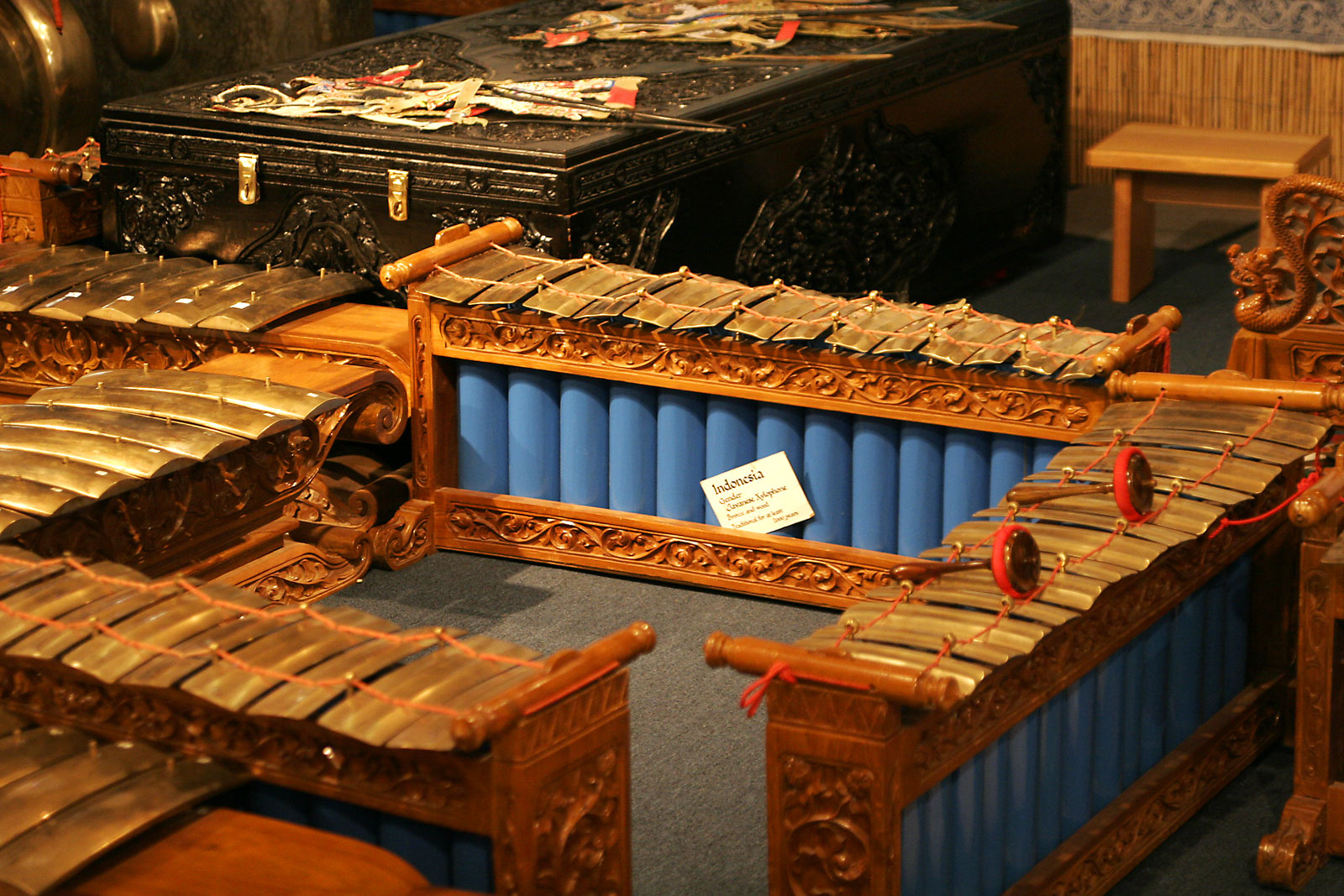
- Classification: Percussion instrument; Idiophone; Metallophone
- Developed: Indonesia

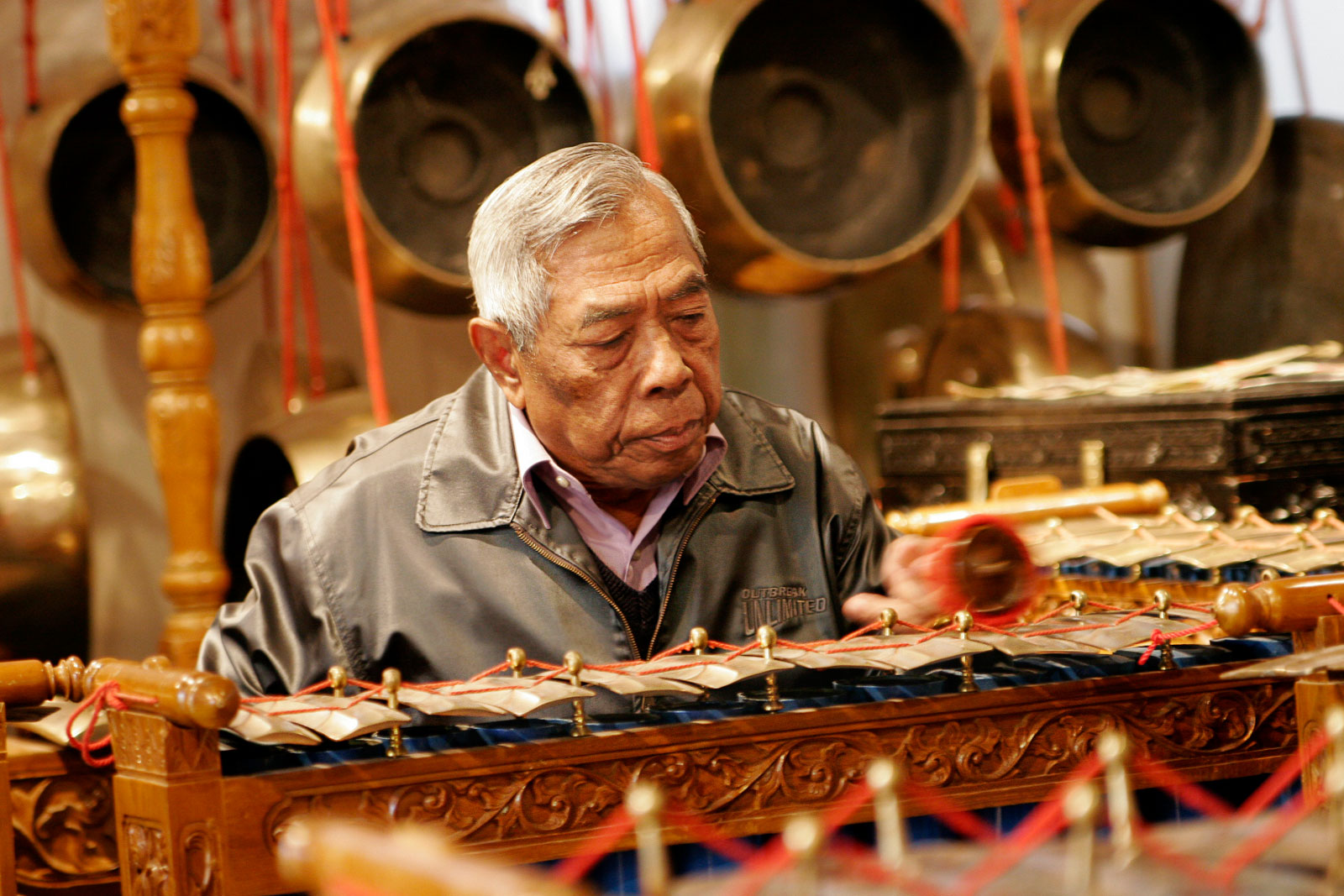
A man playing a gendèr

A gendèr is a type of metallophone used in Balinese and Javanese gamelan music. It consists of 10 to 14 tuned metal bars suspended over a tuned resonator of bamboo or metal, which are tapped with a mallet made of wooden disks (Bali) or a padded wooden disk (Java). Each key is a note of a different pitch, often extending a little more than two octaves. There are five notes per octave, so in the seven-note pélog scale, some pitches are left out according to the pathet. Most gamelans include three gendèr, one for sléndro, one for pelog pathet nem and lima, and one for pelog pathet barang.

The gendèr is similar to the Balinese gangsa, which also has an individual resonator under each key, and the saron, which, although trough-resonated, does have a set of tuned metal bars or keys. It is also similar to the Javanese slenthem, which is pitched lower and has fewer notes. The melodies of the two hands sometimes move in parallel motion, but often play contrapuntally. When playing gendèr barung with two mallets, the technique of dampening, important to most gamelan instruments, becomes more challenging, and the previously hit notes must be dampened by the same hand immediately after the new ones are hit. This is sometimes possible by playing with the mallet at an angle (to dampen one key and play the other), but may require a small pause.

== Types of gendèrs ==
In some types of gamelan, two gendèrs are used, both spanning approximately two and a half octaves, the gendèr barung and the gendèr panerus, pitched an octave higher than the other. In Gamelan Surakarta, the gendèr panerus plays a single line of melodic pattern, following a pattern similar to the siter. The gendèr barung plays a slower, but more complex melodic pattern that includes more separate right and left hand melodic lines that come together in kempyung (approximately a fifth) and gembyang (octave) intervals. The three sizes of gendèr are called jegogan (the largest), jublag, and penyacah. A pair of ten-bar gendèr are called giying.

== Loud-playing and Soft-playing styles ==
The gamelan plays in two different ensemble types: loud-playing ensemble and soft-playing ensemble. The gendèr is used in both styles. The soft-playing style includes voices and instruments like gambang, celempung, rebab, gendèr panerus, and gendèr barung. The loud-playing styles only include instruments like gong ageng, siyem, kempul, kenong, kethuk, kempyang, engkuk-kemong, bonang family, saron family, gendèr slenthem, kendhang family, and bedhug.

Both types of gendèr play semi-improvised patterns called cengkok, which generally elaborate upon the seleh. These are relatively fixed patterns, but can be varied in a number of ways to suit the style, pathet, irama, and mood of the piece, as well as the skill of the performer. The cengkok repertoire for gendèr are more developed and specific than those for most other elaborating instruments. Similarly, the gendèr barung is likely to give cues for changing parts or irama, especially in the absence of a rebab, which usually leads the ensemble. It may also play the buka of a piece.

== See also ==
- Gamelan
- Bonang
- Kethuk
- Music of Java
