= Minggah =

Section of a gamelan composition

The minggah or inggah is a section of a gendhing composition for gamelan.

It follows the merong, after an ompak. It is distinguished from the previous section by the use of kempyang. In the minggah section, the kempyang and kethuk play in the same pattern as in the ketawang, but with no kempul, and the kenong only where the gong ageng goes in the ketawang. Like the merong, it has a diversity of forms which can be specified by naming the number of kethuk strokes used. For example, consider "gendhing kethuk 2 kerep minggah kethuk 4." This means that in the minggah, there will be four gatras per nongan. The structure would then look like:

pTp. pTp. pTp. pTpN
pTp. pTp. pTp. pTpN
pTp. pTp. pTp. pTpN
pTp. pTp. pTp. pTpG

where "." indicates no interpunctuating instrument plays, p indicates the stroke of the kempyang, T the ketuk, N the kenong, and G the simultaneous stroke of the gong and kenong. Thus, in each section, the gong plays once, the kenong divides that into four parts, and then that is divided into parts according to the given structure. Here each nongan lasts 16 beats (keteg), and thus the gongan lasts 64.

All minggah of this form are one gongan (four nongan) in length. However, the minggah may also use one of the other structures, especially the ladrang. If that is the case, the piece will be noted something like "minggah ladrang". If the other section has a different title, that will be given as well.
