= Gamelan notation =

Traditional Indonesian musical notation

Notation plays a relatively minor role in the oral traditions of Indonesian gamelan but, in Java and Bali, several systems of gamelan notation were devised beginning at the end of the 19th century, initially for archival purposes.

== Kepatihan ==
A short melody in slendro notated using Kepatihan notation.

Kepatihan is a type of cipher musical notation that was devised for the notation of the Indonesian gamelan.

=== History ===
The system was devised around 1900 at the Kepatihan (the Grand Vizier's compound) in Surakarta, and was based upon the Galin-Paris-Chevé system, imported in the nineteenth century by Christian missionaries to allow the notation of hymns. It superseded several other notation systems of Javanese origin devised around the same time.

=== Notation ===
The pitches of the seven-tone pélog tuning system are designated by the numbers 1, 2, 3, 4, 5, 6, and 7; while the five-tone slendro pitches are notated as 1, 2, 3, 5, and 6. The octaves are noted by dots above and below the numbers, as in Chinese jianpu, although of course the pitches do not correspond. A dot over a note indicates the octave above, and a dot below a note represents the octave below. Two dots over a note indicate a note two octaves higher than standard, and so on.

Depending on the tuning of the individual gamelan, it is often possible to hear the pitches 1, 2, 3, 5, and 6 of slendro as an anhemitonic pentatonic scale, do-re-mi-sol-la. However, in the pélog system pitches are simply numbered from low to high 1–7 and there is no question of interpreting these sounds diatonically. As the pélog scale is essentially a five-note scale, the notes 4 and 7 function similarly to 'accidentals' in Western terms: a 4 may serve as a 'sharp' or raised 3 (common in patet lima or nem) or as a 'flat' or lowered 5 (usual in patet barang). Similarly 7 functions as a 'flat' 1 in patet lima or nem; 1 in patet barang may function as a 'sharp' 7, but is more often interpreted as a temporary change of pathet.

By default, kepatihan notes are assumed all to have the same duration. Deviations from these regular rhythms are noted in two ways. Beams or lines (overscores) above notes indicate half the standard duration (although this is an area of notation that is often inaccurate in practice). A dot (pin) in the place of a note indicates the continuation of the previous note, not a rest. In vocal parts the figure 0 represents a rest, but rests are not written in instrumental parts, because the instruments normally play continuously and any rests are part of the basic playing style of the instrument. Additional symbols are needed for some instruments; for example, melismas and slurred bowing are noted by lines above or underneath the numbers. Strokes on colotomic instruments are indicated by diacritical marks over or around the kepatihan numbers. There are numerous sets of such marks in use; for example, one set (not an agreed standard) uses a circle for gong ageng, parentheses for gong suwukan, ^ for kenong, ˇ for kempul, + for ketuk, and – for kempyang. All or some of these marks may be omitted, as they can usually be determined from the form (bentuk).

== Performance practice ==
The kepatihan cipher system records the two fixed elements of Javanese gamelan music: the melodic framework (or balungan (literally, skeleton)) represented by numbers, and the set of punctuating gongs that define the form, represented by circles and other symbols. All of the other parts are not notated, but realized by the players at the time of performance, based on their knowledge of the instrument, their training, and the context of the performance (e.g. dance, wayang, concert, wedding, etc.), with the exception of vocal music, which may have lyrics or special melodies that are notated and provided to the singers. In some contemporary compositions, if the classical techniques are not used, more parts might be notated, or just learned by rote in rehearsals. When instruments from other traditions are combined with gamelan (e.g. violin, erhu, tap dancer, bagpipes), notation may be given to those players only if they are accustomed to it.

== Other systems ==
The description above applies to central Javanese music. In the Sundanese music of West Java, the system works in reverse, with 1 representing the highest note instead of the lowest; also a dot over a note indicates the octave below, and a dot below a note represents the octave above.

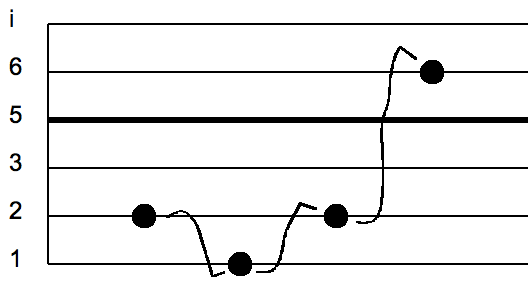
The same notated using the Surakarta method.

=== Surakarta ===
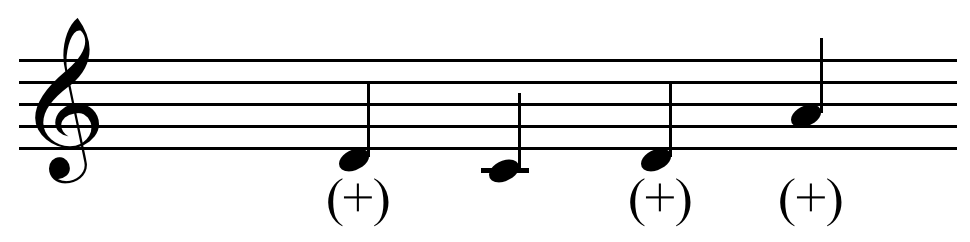
The same approximated using Western notation.

The Solonese script could capture the flexible rhythms of the pesinden with a squiggle on a horizontal staff.

=== Yogyakarta ===
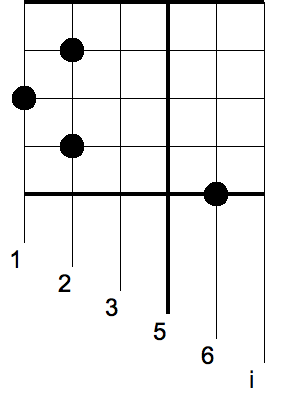
The same notated using the Yogyakarta method or 'chequered notation'.

In Yogyakarta a ladder-like vertical staff allowed notation of the balungan by dots and also included important drum strokes.

== Adaptations with Western notations ==
Kepatihan is widely used in ethnomusicological studies of the gamelan, sometimes accompanied by transcriptions into Western staff notation with approximate mapping of slendro and pelog tuning systems of gamelan onto the western staff, with and without various symbols for microtones. The relative merits of kepatihan and staff notation are sometimes debated (though in Western notation, the first beat of the measure would actually correspond to the fourth, most "weighted" beat in gamelan). In this respect, kepatihan is more suitable, although the usage of overscores (taken from the Galin-Paris-Chevé system) continues to cause practical difficulties.

Attempts to convert gamelan notation to Western notation was extensively done by Walter Spies in Kraton Ngayogyakarta Hadiningrat. The Kraton documented his contribution to a Western orchestra formed by Hamengkubuwono VIII called Kraton Orkest Djocja. In 1927, before leaving the Kraton and moved to Bali, Spies left some adaptations on gamelan notation to be played on piano. On the other hand, gendhing ladrang mares/sabrangan/gati, a musical composition designed to accompany very slow-paced walking (kapang-kapang Srimpi/Bedaya), mixes gamelan, Western brass and string instruments, clash cymbals, and rope-tensioned snare drums (tambur), which needs conversion depend on type of gamelan being used.

== Computer fonts for Gamelan notation ==
=== Non-Unicode codepoints ===
The first font for the Gamelan notation was Kepatihan, a postscript font (usable on Macs) developed by American composer Carter Scholz in 1987. The font uses a non-Unicode notation that has become mainstream. It follows a "keyboard logic": the fonts should/can be used with a US-American keyboard-driver, and symbols are found at keys that make sense by the typical layout of keyboards. For example, the "lower-octave"-ciphers with "dot-below" can be accessed by the keys q-w-e-r-t-y-u because those are the keys one line "below" the number-keys.

KepatihanPro is now the most widely used computer font for gamelan notation. It started life as a PostScript font "Kepatihan" developed by Matthew Arciniega in 1994; the font uses the same "keyboard logic" as Scholz's font, but has a greatly expanded character set allowing full notation of rebab, vocals, and kendhang. In 2000, Raymond Weisling converted the font to TrueType (which works on both Windows and Macs) and renamed it "KepatihanPro" (so that it can co-exist with Scholz's original font). At the time Apple computers were rare in Indonesia, but the adoption of Windows-based computers for word-processing was spreading rapidly. Therefore, the availability of the font for Windows strongly boosted adoption.

On 24 July 2020, the Kraton Yogyakarta announced a new font, Kridhamardawa. It is based on KepatihanPro and uses the same "keyboard-logic" code points. The main changes are typographical: ciphers are darkened (thickened) for enhanced readability and the line-height is significantly reduced (saving page space). The new font also adds additional symbols.

During the early 2000s multiple simplified offsprings of the Kepatihan-font were widely used for cipher-notation of church hymns all over Indonesia, and reportedly even spread to China.

=== Unicode codepoints ===
In 2014, SIL International published Duolos SIL Cipher, which assigns codepoints into standard Unicode locations. The code points are expected to be produced by a special keyboard layout. The font also supports Jianpu notations.

== See also ==
- Gamelan
- Musical notation#Indonesia
- Pelog
- Slendro
- Pathet
- Cengkok
- Music of Indonesia
- Music of Java
