= Gatra (music) =

Indonesian musical melody used in Gamelan

A gatra ("embryo" or "semantic unit") is a unit of melody in Indonesian Javanese gamelan music, analogous to a measure in Western music. It is often considered the smallest unit of a gamelan composition.

A gatra consists of a sequence of four beats (keteg), which are filled with notes (or rests, pin) from the balungan. In general, the second and fourth beats of a gatra are stronger than the first and third, and the final note of a gatra, called the seleh, dominates the gatra. In other words, the gatras are like Western measures in reverse, with the strongest beat at the end. Important colotomic instruments, most notably the gong ageng, are played on that final beat. If the final beat in a gatra is a rest, the seleh is the last note played. It is not uncommon in gamelan repertoire to find entire gatras of rests. Note that the actual length of time it takes to play a gatra varies from less than a second to nearly a minute, depending on the tempo (laya) and the irama.

In kepatihan notation, gatras are generally grouped together in the notation of the balungan, with space added between them. There is, however, no pause between one gatra and the next. The different patterns of notes and rests in a gatra are explained at balungan.

Rahayu Supanggah considers the hierarchical nature of the four beats of a gatra to be reflected on a larger scale in gamelan compositions; in particular by the four nongan in a gongan of the merong and inggah of a gendhing. This is similar to the padang-ulihan ("question-answer") structure key to gamelan composition.

== Names of beats in a gatra ==
At least two sets of terms are used to describe the four notes of a gatra:
Ki Sindusawarno's system: (1) ding kecil (2) dong kecil (3) ding besar (4) dong besar
Martopangrawit's system: (1) maju ('forward') (2) mundur ('back') (3) maju (4) seleh

The first word in the names is Ki Sindusawarno's system are similar to the names of the hierarchy of pitches used in Balinese music: ding represents the secondary note of a pathet, and dong is similar to the Western idea of tonic. Kecil and besar mean "small" and "large," respectively, so clearly this articulates the hierarchical system explained in the introduction, with the largest and most significant beat at the end of the gatra, and a somewhat smaller one halfway through.

The reference for the names in Martopangrawit's system is to kosokan, the direction of bowing of the rebab. It also reflects the idea that the second beat is stronger than the first and third, since drawing a bow tends to produce a stronger sound than pushing it.

== Experimental gatras ==
Although traditionally gatras have always contained four notes, a few recent experimental pieces have used gatras of other lengths, often because of Western music. An example by a Javanese composer is Pak Marto's Parisuka.

== See also ==
- Gamelan
- Pathet
- Gendhing structures
- Irama
- Gamelan notation
- Music of Indonesia
- Music of Java
