= Ompak =

The ompak or umpak ("bridge") is a section of a gamelan composition.

It refers to the opening gongan of a ladrang or ketawang, or four gongans of the lancaran. These sections are usually repeated, and can be repeated as often as desired. This section is also called the bubuka gendhing, which is not to be confused with the buka (i.e. bubuka opaq-opaq). The analogous section for a gendhing is the merong.

Ompak can also refer to the bridge which links separate sections of a gendhing, i.e. between the merong and minggah sections. This usually consists of one or two nongan, or sometimes a whole gongan. The balungan for the ompak may or may not be different from the regular merong, but there is always a different kendhang pattern. The cue to go to the ompak is usually given by an increase in speed from the kendhang, often including a change in irama.
