= Udan Mas =

Gamelan composition

Udan Mas (sometimes written Hudan Mas, the name means "Golden Rain") is a composition for gamelan which is popular in Central Java, especially Yogyakarta. It is a bubaran, which is an ending piece played while the audience departs. In Western concert performances, it is often played as an encore. It is often one of the pieces students learn early in their studies.

The piece can be played in a wide variety of pathet, including pélog pathet barang and nem, and sléndro pathet sanga and nem. It can also be played as either a lancaran or a ladrang, with related balungan.

The recording of the piece on Javanese Court Gamelan, possibly the most famous, is in pélog pathet barang and has a lancaran structure.

Mantle Hood offers an analysis of the ladrang in The Nuclear Theme as a Determinant of Patet in Javanese Music. He adduces it in his theory of the importance of cadence contours in its variation in different pathet.

Hujan Mas, which also means "Golden Rain" in modern Indonesian is a well known 20th century composition for Balinese Gamelan in the kebyar style.
