= Colotomy =

Indonesian musical rhythmic and metric used in Gamelan

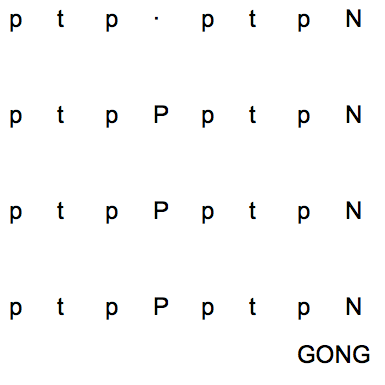
Ladrang form on the phrase making or colotomic instruments. p = kempyang, t = ketuk, ⋅ = pause, N = kenong, P = kempul, GONG = gong ageng.

Colotomy is an Indonesian description of the rhythmic and metric patterns of gamelan music. It refers to the use of specific instruments to mark off nested time intervals, or the process of dividing rhythmic time into such nested cycles. In the gamelan, this is usually done by gongs of various size: the kempyang, ketuk, kempul, kenong, gong suwukan, and gong ageng. The fast-playing instruments, kempyang and ketuk, keep a regular beat. The larger gongs group together these hits into larger groupings, playing once per each grouping. The largest gong, the gong ageng, represents the largest time cycle and generally indicates that the preceding section will be repeated, or the piece will move on to a new section.

The details of the rhythmic patterns depend on the colotomic structure (Javanese: bentuk), also known as gendhing structure. There are a number of different structures, which differ greatly in length and complexity; however, all of them have some colotomic characteristics.

In the gamelan, the instruments which articulate this structure are sometimes called the colotomic instruments (also interpunctuating instruments or structural instruments, while Jennifer Lindsay refers to them as "phrase-making instruments"). The Javanese names for these instruments are onomatopoeic, with the relative resonance of the words gong, kempul, kenong, and ketuk being comparable to that of the instruments they name. In the system of cipher gamelan notation (kepatihan notation), the colotomic parts are notated as diacritical marks on the numbers used to show the core melody (balungan).

== History and usage ==
The English language term was coined, presumably first in Dutch, from the Greek word for a unit of rhythm (colon) and something that divides (-tomy / -tomic), by the ethnomusicologist Jaap Kunst.

Although the term "colotomic" was derived from Indonesian music theory, it can be applied to other musical traditions as well. In particular, it has been used to describe Japanese gagaku and Thai piphat.

== Example of a colotomic structure ==
The lancaran is a cycle of 16 beats (keteg) in the following order:

TWTN TPTN TPTN TPTG

where T indicates the strike of the ketuk, P the kempul, N the kenong, and G the simultaneous stroke of the gong and kenong. The W indicates the wela, the pause where the kempul is omitted. Thus, the gong plays once, the kenong divides that into four parts, the kempul divides each of those in two, and the ketuk divides each of those further in two. Note that except for the kenong playing on the gong, the instruments do not play when the next one plays. (Remember that the gatras of gamelan music have the strong beat (seleh) at the end, not at the beginning as is often considered normal for Western music. Thus the more important structural instruments coincide with the stressed beats.)

Colotomic structures occur on even larger scales in most gamelan pieces as well. For example, a typical lancaran has four gongs, at the end of which the larger gong ageng is played. Groupings of four are most common at all levels of structure, although there are numerous exceptions at larger levels.

The colotomic structure of a piece is the length of the cycle and how the interpunctuating instruments play during that cycle, but they are also musical forms which are associated with specific structural patterns on a larger scale than the colotomic cycle, and guidelines for what tempi and irama may be used.

== Colotomic structures in Javanese gamelan ==
Colotomic structures or Gendhing structures refer to gamelan compositions in general. Gendhing (also written, as in the old orthography, gending) can also be used to refer to a specific class of colotomic structures used in Javanese gamelan music.

At its simplest, colotomic may be taken to mean, "cyclically punctuating". More clearly, "gongs of different sizes are used to mark off circular segments, or cycles, of musical time." Though a colotomic structure may be hundreds of units long and is generally explicitly stated, it is akin to hierarchical Western meter.

Most gendhing in Javanese music conform to one of these structures, except for some special ceremonial pieces and experimental new compositions.

=== General ===
The following colotomic structures are from the general repertoire:

==== Gendhing ====
Gendhing is the longest and most complicated of the gendhing structures. It is typically played in a slow irama, although it may have faster sections. Gendhing are sometimes classified by which elaborating instrument is most prominent, called gendhing bonang or gendhing rebab. Gendhing never use the kempul or gong suwukan.

Gendhing have two parts, a merong and a minggah (or "inggah"). Both consist of a single gongan lasting four nongan, but the nongan can be of different lengths. Gendhing are then classified according to the number of kethuk strokes in a nongan in each section. The merong section does not use the kempyang, but the minggah section does. There are two patterns for the kethuk in the merong, arang ("infrequent, sparse") and kerep ("frequent"). Both have the kethuk play only at the end of a gatra, but in the kerep pattern, it is at the end of all odd-numbered gatras, whereas in the arang, it is at the end of the gatras of doubled odd numbers (that is, gatras 2, 6, 10, 14, etc.). In the minggah section, the kempyang and kethuk play in the same pattern as in the ketawang, but with no other interpunctuating instruments.

For an example of the gendhing structure, consider "gendhing kethuk 2 kerep minggah kethuk 4." This means that in the merong, there will be two kethuk strokes that happen on odd-numbered gatra, and in the minggah, there will be four gatras per nongan. The structure would then look like:

Merong:

...T .... ...T ...N
...T .... ...T ...N
...T .... ...T ...N
...T .... ...T ...G

Minggah:

pTp. pTp. pTp. pTpN
pTp. pTp. pTp. pTpN
pTp. pTp. pTp. pTpN
pTp. pTp. pTp. pTpG

where "." indicates no interpunctuating instrument plays, p indicates the stroke of the kempyang, T the ketuk, N the kenong, and G the simultaneous stroke of the gong and kenong. Thus, in each section, the gong plays once, the kenong divides that into four parts, and then that is divided into parts according to the given structure. Here, in each part, each nongan lasts 16 beats (keteg), and thus the gongan lasts 64.

That was a fairly short example; a "kethuk 4 arang" merong, for example, would look like:

.... ...T .... .... .... ...T .... .... .... ...T .... .... .... ...T .... ...N
.... ...T .... .... .... ...T .... .... .... ...T .... .... .... ...T .... ...N
.... ...T .... .... .... ...T .... .... .... ...T .... .... .... ...T .... ...N
.... ...T .... .... .... ...T .... .... .... ...T .... .... .... ...T .... ...G

and thus a nongan would last 16 gatras (64 beats), and a gongan 64 gatras (256 beats). Obviously, in a long structure like that, especially at a slow tempo, a single gongan may last many minutes.

The merong section may include a ngelik, which would also have the length of a single gongan. The minggah section may also use one of the other structures, especially the ladrang. If that is the case, the piece will be noted something like "minggah ladrang". If the other section has a different name, that will be given as well.

Between the merong and inggah is a bridge section called the ompak. Typically it has the length of one nongan, and a contrasting balungan melody to the merong.

==== Ketawang ====
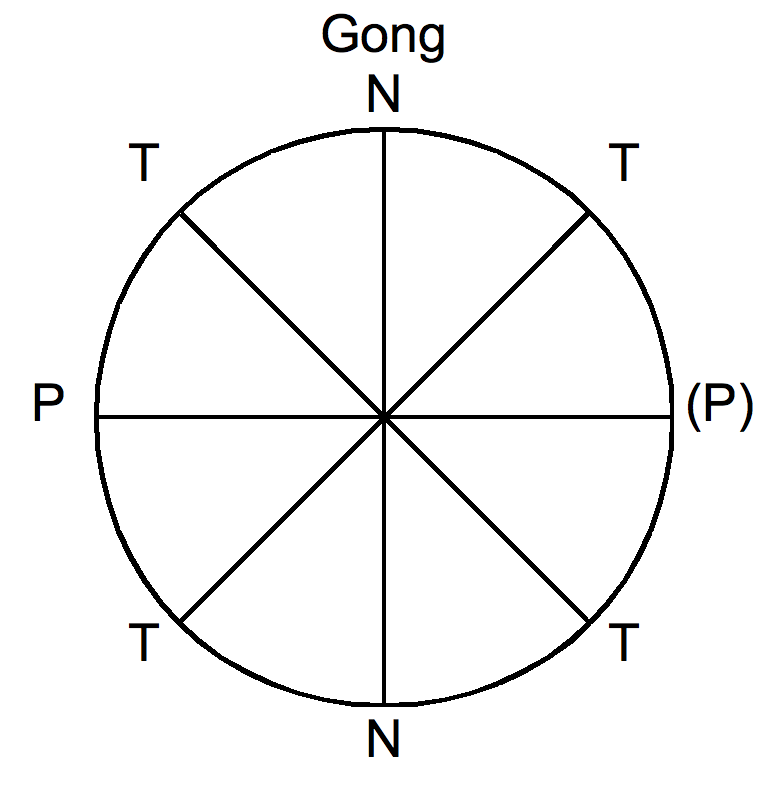
Ketawang structure as a clock diagram. T = kethuk, P = kempul, N = kenong, Gong = gong ageng.

The ketawang is one of the gendhing structures used in Javanese gamelan music.

Its colotomic structure is:

pTpW pTpN pTpP pTpG

where p indicates the strike of the kempyang, T the ketuk, P the kempul, N the kenong, and G the simultaneous stroke of the gong and kenong. The W indicates the wela, the pause where the kempul is omitted. Thus, the gong plays once, the kenong divides that into two parts, the kempul (or wela) divides each of those in two, the ketuk divides each of those further in two, and finally the kempyang divides each of those in two. The kendhang usually plays in kendhang kalih style.

Ketawang usually have the specific form of an ompak that lasts one gongan and may be repeated several times, and a ngelik that may last three or four gongan. Some ketawang have the same ompak but different ngelik. Ketawang often begin in irama tanggung and then slow down to irama dadi or slower.

The ketawang developed in the court of Prince Mangkunegara IV (r. 1853–1881) of Surakarta.

Famous ketawang: Puspawarna.

==== Lancaran ====
The lancaran is one of the gendhing structures used in Javanese gamelan music. It is the shortest of the gendhing structures that are not from the wayang repertoire. Gangsaran and bubaran are related structures that share the same colotomic structure.

Groupings of four are most common at all levels of this structure. The basic colotomic structure is a cycle of 16 beats (keteg) in the following order:

TWTN TPTN TPTN TPTG

where T indicates the strike of the ketuk, P the kempul, N the kenong, and G the simultaneous stroke of the gong and kenong. The W indicates the wela, the pause where the kempul is omitted. Thus, the gong plays once, the kenong divides that into four parts, the kempul divides each of those in two, and the ketuk divides each of those further in two. Note that except for the kenong playing on the gong, the instruments do not play when the next one plays. The kendhang plays in kendhang kalih style. A typical lancaran has four gongs, at the end of which the larger gong ageng is played.

Lancaran are usually played fast, usually in irama lancar. Some lancaran have a separate section which can be played between repetitions of the four-gong ompak, known as the nyekar or lagu. Lancaran are often written in balungan nibani.

Bubaran are played more moderately, usually in irama tanggung, but are usually written in balungan mlaku. They also use a distinctive kendhang pattern. A bubaran is used as an ending piece, to be played while the audience is departing. The best-known bubaran is Udan Mas.

Gangsaran is a variety of lancaran which consists of simply a repeated tone. It originates from the wayang repertoire. It can appear at the end of a composition as well.

==== Ladrang ====
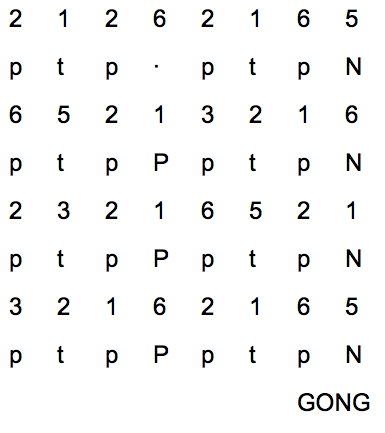
Ladrang form on the balungan instruments. GONG = gong ageng.

The ladrang is one of the gendhing structures used in Javanese gamelan music.

The basic colotomic structure is a cycle of 32 beats (keteg) in the following order:

pTpW pTpN pTpP pTpN pTpP pTpN pTpP pTpG

where p indicates the strike of the kempyang, T the ketuk, P the kempul, N the kenong, and G the simultaneous stroke of the gong ageng and kenong. The W indicates the wela, the pause where the kempul is omitted. Thus, the gong plays once, the kenong divides that into four parts, the kempul divides each of those in two, the ketuk divides each of those in two, and the kempyang divides each of those in two. The kendhang usually plays in kendhang kalih style.

The ladrang is similar to the ketawang except that four (instead of two) nongan comprise a gongan. It is also similar to the lancaran, except it is twice as slow, and the kempyang plays in between each beat of the lancaran.

Many ladrang have two sections, an ompak and a ngelik, each of which typically last one gongan. Ladrang can be played in any irama except for lancar.

=== Wayang ===
In Javanese gamelan music, there are a few gendhing structures derived from the wayang repertoire: Ayak-ayakan, Sampak, and Srepeg.

==== Ayak-ayakan ====
The ayak-ayakan is one structure.

The colotomic structure is:

...P ...P
TNTN TNTN

with both lines played together, and T indicating a stroke of the kethuk, P the kempul, and N the kenong. The kenong and kempul always play the seleh. In slendro manyura, the gong suwukan is used instead of the kempul.

Gongans are of varying length, according to the pathet. The ending (suwuk) can occur at different points in the cycle, given the cue from the kendhang or kepyak.

It usually begins in irama lancar, and then slows down to tanggung, dados, or rangkep.

The ayak-ayakan is often used to accompany the entrance of puppets, or the transition between pathets.

==== Sampak ====
Sampak is another structure. A sampak often follows a srepeg. It is the fastest of the wayang structures.

The colotomic structure is:

NNNNNNNN NNNNNNNN
TPTPTPTP TPTPTPTP

with both lines played together, and T indicating a stroke of the kethuk, P the kempul, and N the kenong. The kenong and kempul always play the seleh. It does not use the kempyang.

Gongans are of varying length, usually two, three, or four gatras, based on a signal from the kendhang. The ending (suwuk) can occur at any point in the cycle, given the cue from the kendhang or kepyak, and consists of a gatra played after the gong. The melodic shape of a sampak is distinctive, as the gatras are repeated notes in the pathet. It is played in irama lancar.

===== Example =====
Sampak pélog barang:

2222 3333 7777
7777 2222 6666
6666 3333 2222
Suwuk: xx22

This sampak has three gongan. The signal to end can come at any gong, where the player plays the next two notes as normal, and then 22 (as indicated by xx22).

==== Srepeg ====
Srepeg is another colotomic structure:

...P...P ...P...P
TNTNTNTN TNTNTNTN

with both lines played together, and T indicating a stroke of the kethuk, P the kempul, and N the kenong. The kenong and kempul always play the seleh.

Gongans are of varying length, according to the pathet. The ending (suwuk) can occur at any point in the cycle, given the cue from the kendhang or kepyak. The melodic shape of a srepeg is distinctive, as it consists mostly of the seleh alternating with a neighbor tone.

It is usually fast and played in irama lancar.

== See also ==
- Gamelan
- Cycle (music)
- Division (music)
- Irama
- Music of Indonesia
- Music of Java
