= Ngelik =

Section of a gamelan composition

The ngelik (or lik) is a part of an Indonesian gamelan composition that contrasts with the surrounding section, either the ompak or merong. It is also sometimes called the gendhing proper, in contrast to the bubuka gendhing (i.e. ompak).

The ngelik is often associated with a higher pitch, and is usually the part where the gerong sings the main melody of the composition. As many ketawang have the same ompak, the ngelik can be the main determinant of what the piece is.

Ngelik vary in length, but are usually longer than the surrounding ompak in a ketawang, the same length as the ompak in a ladrang, and the same length as the merong in a gendhing. The latter two are typically one gongan in length (like the surrounding section), whereas the ketawang ngelik is usually three or four gongan.
