= Gatra =

Gatra or GATRA may refer to:

- Gatra (magazine), weekly news magazine in Indonesia published from 1994 to 2024
- Gatra (music), in Indonesian gamelan music
- Greater Attleboro Taunton Regional Transit Authority, Massachusetts, US

== See also ==
- Gotra, term in Indian genealogy
