= Gongan =

Gongan or Gong'an may refer to:

- Gong'an County (公安县), Jingzhou, Hubei, China
- Gong'an, Zhongshan County (公安镇), town in Guangxi, China
- Gong'an fiction, a subgenre of Chinese crime fiction revolving around government magistrates solving criminal cases
- Koan, also known as Gongan, story, dialogue, question, or statement in Chán Buddhism
- Gonganbu, or the Ministry of Public Security, the PRC's domestic security agency, civil registrar and police force
- Gongan, the time span between gong ageng strikes in gamelan music
