= Golden rain =

Golden Rain may refer to:

- Goldenrain tree (Koelreuteria paniculata), a tree species native to eastern Asia, China and Korea
- Laburnum anagyroides, a species of small tree native to Europe
- a rosemary cultivar
- The crystallisation process of lead(II) iodide

== See also ==
- Udan Mas
