= Bonang =

Indonesian musical instrument used in Gamelan

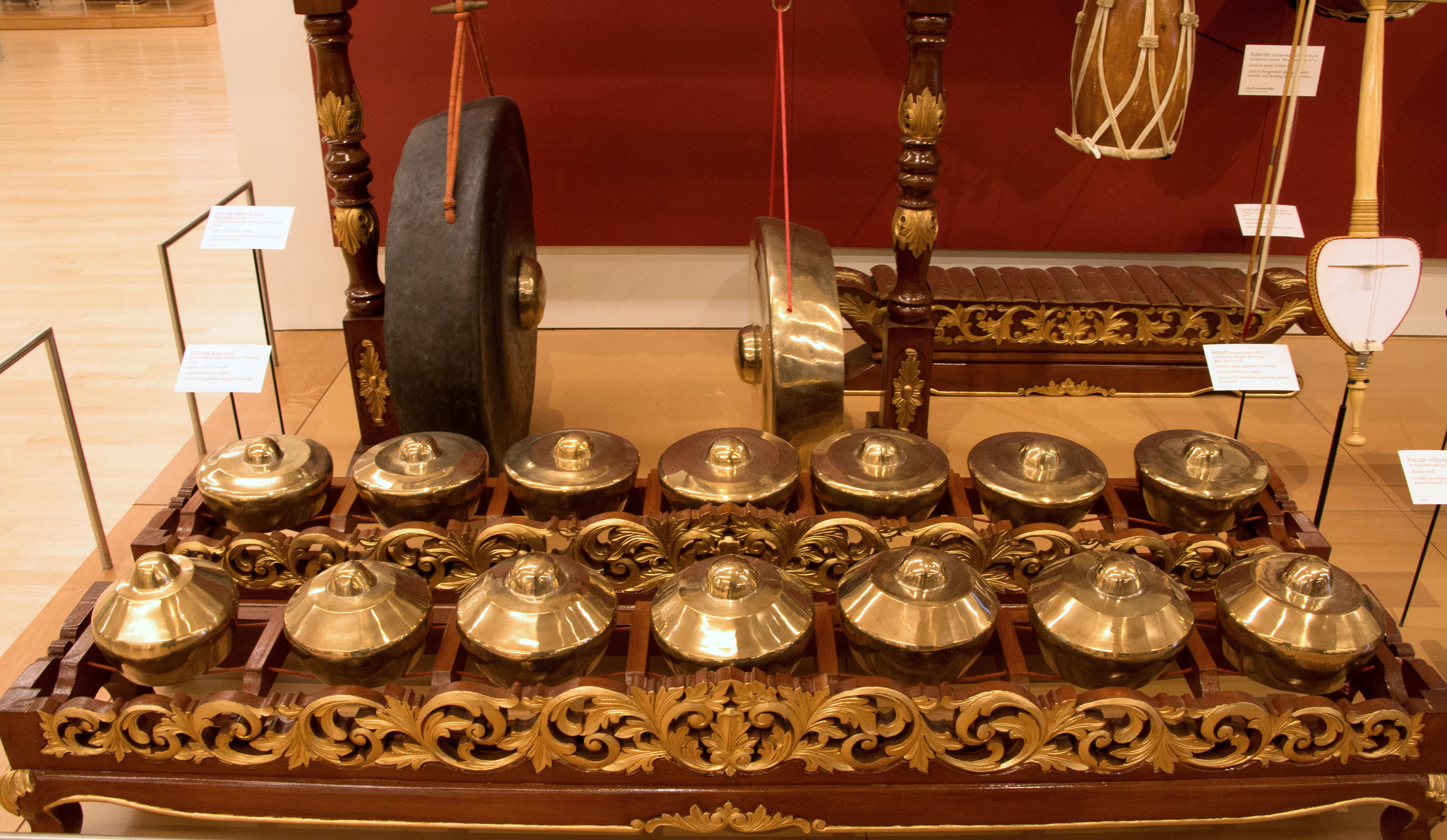
- Classification: Percussion instrument; Idiophone; Gong
- Developed: Indonesia

The bonang is an Indonesian musical instrument used in the Javanese gamelan. It is a collection of small gongs (sometimes called "kettles" or "pots") placed horizontally onto strings in a wooden frame (rancak), either one or two rows wide. All of the kettles have a central boss, but around it the lower-pitched ones have a flattened head, while the higher ones have an arched one. Each is tuned to a specific pitch in the appropriate scale; thus there are different bonang for pelog and slendro. They are typically hit with padded sticks (tabuh). This is similar to the other cradled gongs in the gamelan, the kethuk, kempyang, and kenong. Bonang may be made of forged bronze, welded and cold-hammered iron, or a combination of metals. In addition to the gong-shaped form of kettles, economical bonang made of hammered iron or brass plates with raised bosses are often found in village gamelan, in Suriname-style gamelan, and in some American gamelan. In central Javanese gamelan there are three types of bonang used:

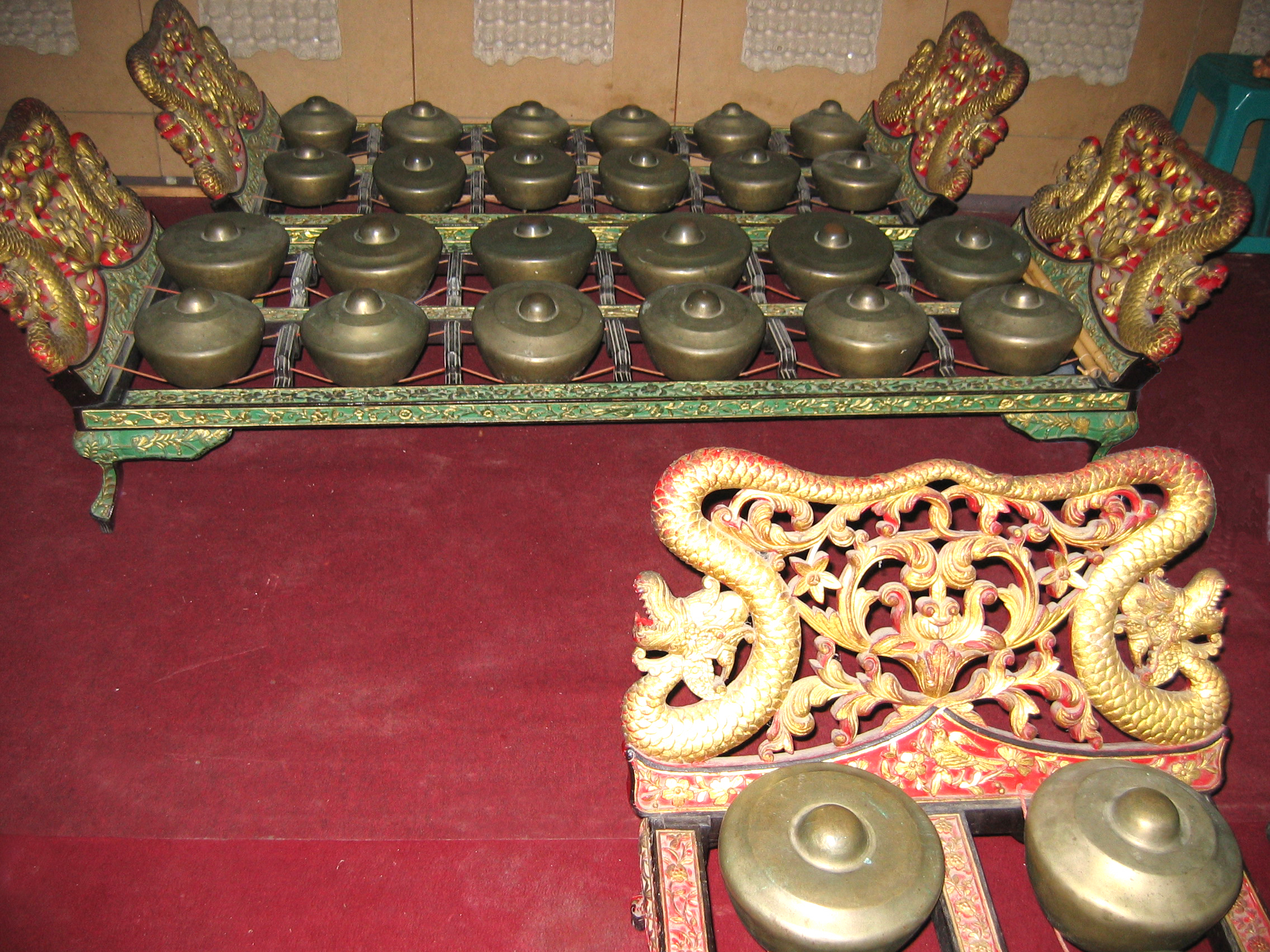
Javanese bonang in Surakarta.

Man demonstrating the arrangement of sundanese bonang in pairs of notes in ascending pentatonic scale.

- Bonang panerus is the highest of them and uses the smallest kettles. It generally covers two octaves (sometimes more in slendro on Solonese-style instruments), covering approximately the same range as the saron and peking combined. It plays the fastest rhythms of the bonang, either interlocking with or playing at twice the speed of the bonang barung.
- Bonang barung is pitched one octave below the bonang panerus, and also generally covers two octaves, approximately the same range as the demung and saron combined. This is one of the most important instruments in the ensemble, as it gives many of the cues to other players in the gamelan.
- Bonang panembung is pitched the lowest. It is more common in Yogyanese style gamelan, covering approximately the same range as the slenthem and demung combined. When present in Solonese-style gamelan, it may have only one row of six (slendro) or seven kettles sounding in the same register as the slenthem. It is reserved for the most austere repertoire, typically playing a paraphrase of the balungan.

The parts played by the bonang barung and bonang panerus are more complex than many instruments in the gamelan; thus, it is generally considered an elaborating instrument. Sometimes it plays melodies based on the balungan, though generally modified simply. However, it can also play more complex patterns, obtained by combining barung and panerus patterns, such as the alternation of interlocking parts (imbal) and the interpolation of florid melodic patterns (sekaran).

The kolenang, a bonang whose single row of kettles is laid out in a V or U shape, is a leading melodic instrument in the Sundanese Gamelan degung.

The bonang is similar to the Balinese reong and the single-row kulintang of the southern Philippines and Borneo.

== See also ==
- Gamelan
- Kenong
- Gong ageng
- Kethuk
- Music of Indonesia
- Music of Java
