= Irama (disambiguation) =

Irama is the term used for tempo in Indonesian gamelan in Java and Bali.

Irama may also refer to:

== People ==
- Irama (singer) (born 1995), Italian singer-songwriter and rapper
- Rhoma Irama (born 1946), Indonesian dangdut singer, songwriter, guitarist and former politician of Sundanese descent

== Other uses ==
- Irama (album), 2016 studio album by Irama
