= Kepyak =

Indonesian musical instrument used in Gamelan

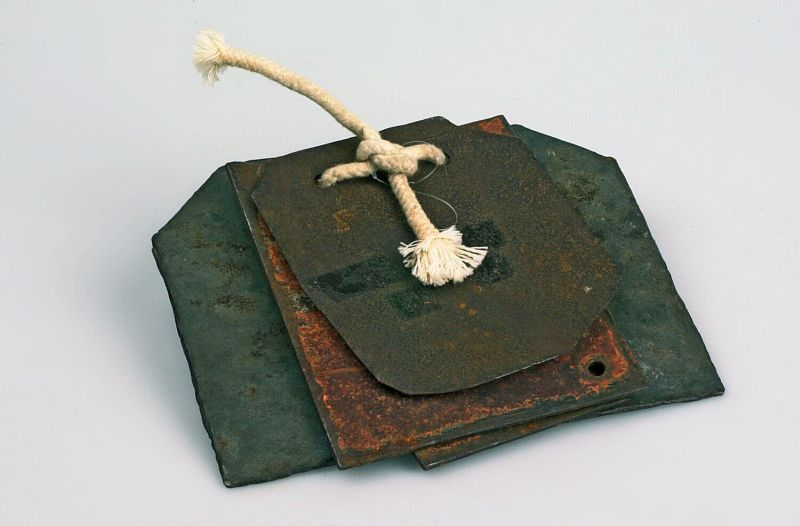
Kepyak

The Kepyak is a percussion instrument played by the dalang (puppeteer) of a wayang performance in Java, Indonesia. It is a struck idiophone consisting of several bronze or iron plates attached by strings (in Surakarta) or a single plate (in Yogyakarta), which the dalang plays with a small mallet held between the toes of his right foot. It is placed on the side of the keprak, a wooden box which can also be played directly. The kepyak can also be played with a mallet (cempala), either in the hand in dance performance, or in the foot in wayang. The kepyak used in dance performances is smaller than that used in wayang. The use of the kepyak is called kepyakan.

It is used to signal cues to the gamelan to begin or end pieces, or change tempo or pathet. It has a distinctive sound which can be heard quite clearly during performance.
