= Mantle Hood =

American ethnomusicologist

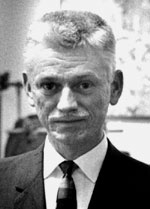
A portrait of Mantle Hood taken in 1960.

Mantle Hood (June 24, 1918 – July 31, 2005) was an American ethnomusicologist. Among other areas, he specialized in studying gamelan music from Indonesia. Hood pioneered, in the 1950s and 1960s, a new approach to the study of music, and the creation of the first American university program devoted to ethnomusicology, at the University of California, Los Angeles (UCLA).

He was known for making the suggestion that his students learn to play the music they were studying. While it was somewhat novel at the time, this concept (dubbed by Hood bi-musicality) is a central tool of ethnomusicology today.

== Biography ==
Born and raised in Springfield, Illinois, Hood studied piano as a child and played clarinet and tenor saxophone in regional jazz clubs in his teens. Despite his talent as a musician, he had no plans to make it his profession. He moved to Los Angeles in the 1930s and wrote pulp fiction while employed as a draftsman in the aeronautical industry.

After Army service in Europe during World War II, he returned to Los Angeles. He enrolled in the School of Agriculture at the University of California before transferring to UCLA.

Between 1945 and 1950 Mantle Hood studied Western music under composer Ernst Toch and composed several classical pieces. Hood earned both his BA in music and MA in composition from UCLA in 1951. As a Fulbright scholar, Hood studied Indonesian music under Jaap Kunst at the University of Amsterdam.

He wrote his Ph.D. dissertation on pathet, translated as the modal system of Central Javanese music. He proposed that the contours of the balungan (nuclear theme) melody are the primary determinants of Javanese musical modes. The dissertation, The Nuclear Theme as a Determinant of Patet in Javanese Music was published in 1954.

After completing his doctoral work in 1954, Hood spent two years in Indonesia doing field research funded by a Ford Foundation fellowship. He joined the faculty at UCLA where he established the first gamelan performance program in the United States in 1958. He also founded the Institute for Ethnomusicology at UCLA in 1960. UCLA quickly became an important American hub of this rapidly developing field. Hood's work spawned a legion of teachers and leaders of the more than 100 gamelan groups in the United States today.

A renowned expert in Javanese and Balinese music and culture, Hood received honors from the Indonesian government for his research, among them the conferral of the title Ki (literally "the venerable") in 1986, and in 1992 was one of the first non-Indonesians to be honored with membership into the Dharma Kusuma (Society of National Heroes).

Hood wrote numerous novels, scholarly books and articles in journals and encyclopedias. Some of his works include The Ethnomusicologist (1971, 1982), Music in Indonesia (1972), the three-volumed The Evolution of Javanese Gamelan.

In 1973, Hood left UCLA and retired to Hawaii where he composed music and served as an editor of The New Grove Dictionary of Music and Musicians. He also wrote contributions for the Harvard Dictionary of Music and the Encyclopedie de la Musique.

In the 1980s, he came out of retirement in Hawaii to become Senior Distinguished Professor at the University of Maryland, Baltimore County, where he remained until 1996, establishing an ethnomusicology program. He was a professor of music at West Virginia University and a visiting professor at Harvard, Yale, Wesleyan, Queen's University Belfast, Indiana, and Drake Universities as well as the University of Ghana. He also served as president of the Society for Ethnomusicology from 1965 to 1967. In 1999 he was the Charles Seeger Lecturer at the annual conference of the SEM.

Mantle Hood's wife, Hazel Chung, was a teacher of Indonesian and African dance. Hood, with Chung, shot footage in Ghana and Nigeria for their film, Atumpan: The Talking Drums of Ghana (1964).

In 1990, Mantle Hood presented a paper at the 7th International Congress of the European Seminar in Ethnomusicology in Berlin under the title "The Quantum Theory of Music." The concept sought to revolutionize research in music by developing theoretical and practical constructs to close a 75-year gap between the 1920s, which were the beginning of the quantum age in the sciences, and the present. An international consortium was formed (England, France, Germany, Italy, the Netherlands, Russia, and the United States). This consortium resulted in an interdisciplinary five-day workshop with the keynote paper on this subject held in Trieste, Italy, including scholars in physics, mathematics, acoustics, computer-based musical composition, and ethnomusicology. In the following year, seminars in ethnomusicology were held in Venice, Italy. In subsequent years, a core group continued to explore new paradigms inspired by Hood's concepts, and worked through correspondence and meetings. The group included Giovanni Giuriati of the University of Rome, Rudiger Schumacher of the University of Cologne, John E. Myers of Bard College at Simon's Rock, and others. Schumacher and Myers delivered related papers at the annual conference of the European Seminar in Ethnomusicology, held in Barcelona, Spain, September 20–25, 1993. In 1999, Hood outlined key principles of his quantum theory - influenced thinking in his paper "Ethnomusicology's Bronze Age in Y2K," delivered as the Seeger Lecture at the congress of the Society for Ethnomusicology held in Austin, Texas.

Hood died in Ellicott City, Maryland. His son Made Mantle Hood is also an ethnomusicologist who taught at The University of Melbourne in Australia. and the Universiti Putra Malaysia.

== Bi-musicality ==
Mantle Hood explained ethnomusicology as being the "study of music wherever and whenever." While his teacher Jaap Kunst wrote the two volumes of Music in Java without actually playing any of the music, Hood required that his students learn to play the music they were studying. While Hood was not the first ethnomusicologist to attempt learning to perform the music being studied, he gave the approach a name in his 1960 article on bi-musicality. It has been an important ethnomusicological research tool ever since. The approach enables the researcher to, in some manner, learn about music "from the inside", and thereby experience its technical, conceptual and aesthetic challenges. The student is also able to better connect socially with the community being studied and have better access to the community's rituals and performances.

The inspiration of "bi-musical" was "bi-lingual". Hood applied the term to music the same way a linguist would when describing someone who spoke two languages. He also strongly proposed that musicology students should know the spoken language of the musical culture being studied. This led to the breakdown of the steadfast rule of having to have competence in French and German at many musicology programs. Now Javanese, Spanish, Hindi, Portuguese, Navajo, Finnish, Quechua, Korean or any other topic-relevant language can fulfill foreign-language requirements.

== Quotations ==
"This emphasis upon music as communication, human understanding, and world peace, not only through musical performance, but also through research, teaching, and other forms of dissemination, is one of the greatest gifts Mantle Hood has given to ethnomusicology."

== Selected musical compositions ==
- "Gending Shin," a bubaran for Javanese gamelan, adopted by the Japanese club as the closing number for all future concerts, World Premier Kyoto, Japan, May 2, 1998.
- "Gending Lou" transcribed for Balinese gamelan Semar Pegulingan, 1989, adapted for dance drama, scheduled for two performances in February, 1990.
- "Gendhing Ageng Lou" for Javanese gamelan pelog in two continuous movements, commissioned by Lou Harrison, 1988, scheduled for World Premier April 10, 1990.
- "Selamat Singapadu" for gender wayang quartet, 1988.
- "Saratoga Springs" for Balinese gamelan angklung, dedicated to Lou Harrison, in press, Balungan, 1986.
- "Marta Budaja" for Javanese gamelan slendro, in three patet; commissioned by the American composer Lou Harrison, 1983; premiered May 8, 1984; two performances at the Saratoga Springs Music festival 1986; performance at Expo '86, Vancouver, B.C.; in press, Balungan, 1986.
- "Explosion" for percussion quintet, premiered 1983.
- "Implosion" for percussion quartet, premiered 1981, published by Somers, 1982.
- "Aloha Is," text and music for Hawaiian anthem, premiered Honolulu International Center, 1976.
- "Four Ballads for Tenor Voice, text and music, 1976.
- "Sound Partials" for 17 Buddhist gongs, commissioned by Hazel Chung for solo choreography, premiered at Theater Vanguard, Los Angeles, 1974.
- "Negotiated Peace" for string quartert premiered at UCLA,1973.
- "Sekar Anjar" for Balinese gamelan angklung, commissioned for solo choreography by I Made' Bandem, premiered at Ojai Festival in California, 1972.
- "Pandji Kesemaran" for Balinese gamelan angklung, commissioned by I Made' Bandem for choreography for three dancers, premiered at Ojai Festival in California, 1972.
- "Time to Mourn" for seven diverse African, Southeast Asian, and East Asia percussion instruments, commissioned by Hazel Chung for choreography for dance company, premiered at Kennedy Theater, East-West Center, Honolulu, 1968.
- "Emergence" for eight players, a synthesis of South Asian, Southeast Asian, Polynesian, East Asian, African, and Western musical instruments and concepts (see
- Documentary Films, "Three for Dance)," 1968.
- "Owari" for 11 performers, a synthesis of African, Asian, and Western musical instruments and concepts, premiered at Kennedy Theater, East-West Center, Honolulu, 1968.
