= Nyekar =

Grave visitation tradition in Indonesia

Nyekar (Javanese: nyekar, lit. 'to scatter flowers') is a traditional practice of grave visitation (ziarah kubur) in Indonesia, especially among Javanese and other Muslim communities. The tradition involves cleaning the graves, sprinkling of flowers (often kembang setaman), pouring scented water, reciting verses of the Quran and communal prayers (including tahlil) for the deceased.

The practice is particularly popular in the run-up to the Islamic holy month of Ramadan and before Eid al-Fitr, when families visit the graves of relatives and ancestors to pray and upkeep the burial sites.

== Origins and history ==
The word nyekar is derived from the Javanese root word sekar which means “flower,” In Javanese the word refers to the scattering of flowers on a grave as a mark of respect for the dead.

Nyekar is generally understood as a syncretic tradition arising from the interaction of indigenous Javanese beliefs, Hindu-Buddhist cultural influences, and Islamic practices. Prior to the dissemination of Islam throughout the Indonesian archipelago, indigenous practices emphasized reverence for ancestral spirits and holy sites.

The spread of Islam in Java in the 15th and 16th centuries, particularly the traditional activities associated with the Wali Sanga, did not mean the destruction of existing cultural practices but their integration into Islamic religious life.

Scholars have characterized this as part of a larger pattern of cultural accommodation in Indonesian Islam, where previously existing ritual practices for the dead and the remembrance of death were re-interpreted as a prayer within an Islamic theological framework.

== Ritual practices ==
While the nyekar practice varies regionally, a typical nyekar visit may include the following:

- Family members clear weeds and debris around the burial place.
- Visitors scatter flower petals, known as kembang setaman, over the grave.
- Rose water or plain water may be sprinkled over the grave or tombstone.
- Quranic verses, usually including the Surah Ya-Sin, are recited and followed by prayers for the dead.

Nyekar can be performed any time of the year, but participation increases in the month of Shaʿban (known in the Javanese calendar as Ruwah) before Ramadan.

In some areas, nyekar is also incorporated into larger community ceremonies such as nyadran or sadranan, which involve cemetery visits, communal feasting, and village gatherings.

== Cultural and social significance ==
Nyekar is a religious act of remembrance and supplication, but it is also a social practice based on the family reunions and the transmission of lineage. Ethnographic research highlights the importance of nyekar in uniting different communities, in local history and in the moral education of the younger generation.

== Religious views and debates ==
There are different attitudes toward nyekar among Muslim communities in Indonesia.

Traditionalist Muslims often consider the practice as a commendable religious act because it encourages prayer for the deceased and reflection on mortality.

Some reformist Muslim groups, while accepting grave visits as a way of remembering death and praying for the deceased as recognized by Islam, criticize some religious practices, such as offerings or practices that are considered to seek blessings from the deceased, arguing that these may consider religious innovations (bid'at).

Despite such debates, nyekar remains widely practiced in Java and other parts of Indonesia.

== See also ==
- Islam Nusantara
- Wali Songo
- Ziyarat
