= Seleh =

Indonesian musical melody used in Gamelan

The sèlèh note or nada seleh is an Indonesian music concept used in Javanese gamelan music. In Javanese gamelan music, the sèlèh note or nada seleh is the final note of a gatra, or four-beat melodic unit. As such it is the note which serves as the goal for all the various strands of the musical texture.

== See also ==
- Gamelan
- kotekan
- Gatra
- Colotomy
- Slendro
- Music of Indonesia
- Music of Java
