= Kempul =

Indonesian musical instrument used in Gamelan

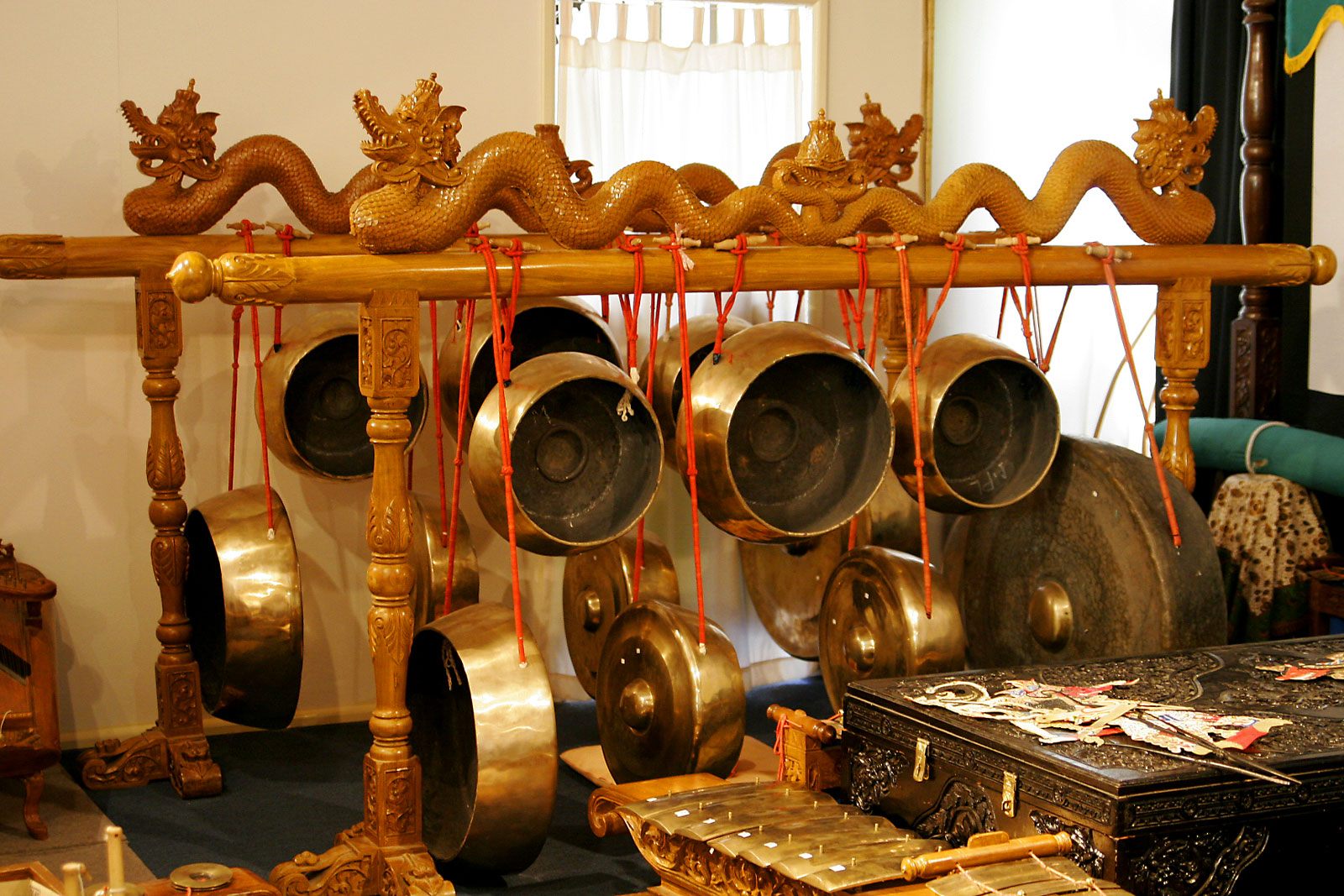
- Classification: Percussion instrument; Idiophone; Gong
- Developed: Indonesia

A kempul is a type of hanging gong used in Indonesian gamelan. The kempul is a set of pitched, hanging, knobbed gongs, often made of bronze, wood, and cords. Ranging from 19 to 25.4 cm (7.5 to 10.0 in) in diameter, the kempul gong has a flat surface with a protruding knob at the center and is played by hitting the knob with the "soft end of a mallet." The wooden mallet used has a ball shape head with heavy padding on a short wooden handle. The number of kempul gongs present in a gamelan ensemble varies but, "although there can be two to ten kempul on one separate rack, it is common to have five kempul hanging on the same rack as the Gong ageng and gong siyem" (two larger gongs).

== Kempul in music ==
"Generally, the instruments in a gamelan orchestra may fall into the following three functional categories:

1. Instruments that delineate the structure of the piece;
2. Instruments that guide temporal flow of the music;
3. Instruments that carry melodies in both simple and elaborate forms"

"Instruments in the first category include large and medium hanging gongs (Gong ageng and gong suwukan), small hanging gongs (kempul), large standing gongs (kenong), and a pair of small standing gongs (kethuk-kempyang)." "The role of the kempul is to divide the nongans, which are the contents of each part between strikes of a kenong."

"In the middle of the gamelan, the 'skeletal' melody called the balungan is played on bronze metallophones. The balungan is puntuated by the larger gongs (gong and kempul) and horizontally-mounted gongs (kenong, kethuk, and kempyang) at the back of the gamelan." "The kempul, a middle voice gong, punctuates half way to the mid-points of the metric cycle, which is played by the kenong (the kettle gongs)." "In all the central Javanese traditions, the pieces known as Ayak-ayakan, Srepegan, and Sampak are united by a single relationship between kempul and kenong: one kempul beat coinciding with every second kenong beat."

== Tuning ==
"There are two racks of gongs in a gamelan orchestra because of the two gamelan scales or laras." "These two tuning systems are called slendro and pelog, thus the full gamelan is actually a double set. Usually the slendro set faces the front and the pelog set the side." The two sets are never played simultaneously. "The slendro tuning consists of five notes per octave and the five intervals consist of small and medium steps. The pelog has seven pitches per octave."

"In the older ensembles of east Java, one usually finds only one kempul, tuned to a pitch 6 or pitch 5, and one Gong ageng, with no siyem or gong suwukan. Following the augmentation of ensembles in central Java over the last century, however, the east Javanese have added one or two siyem and three or four kempul for each tuning system in many ensembles."

== See also ==
- Gamelan
- Bonang
- Gong gede
- Kethuk
- Music of Indonesia
- Music of Java
