= Irama =

Indonesian musical tempo used in Gamelan

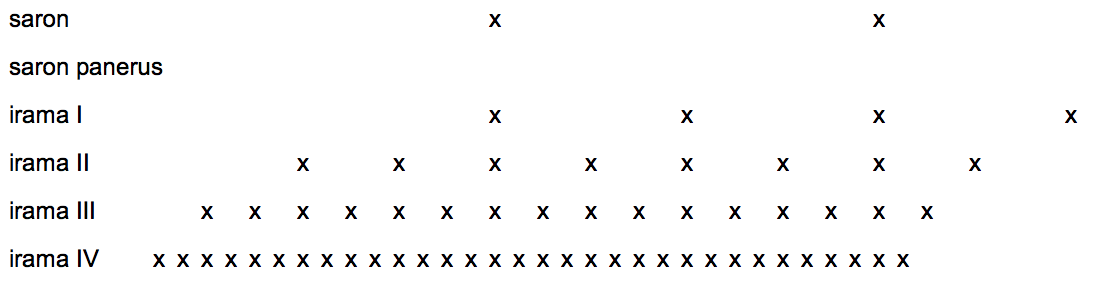
Number of saron panerus notes per saron note in each irama.

Irama is the term used for tempo in Indonesian gamelan in Java and Bali. It can be used with elaborating instruments. It is a concept used in Javanese gamelan music, describing melodic tempo and relationships in density between the balungan, elaborating instruments, and gong structure. It is distinct from tempo (Javanese: Laya), as each Irama can be played in different tempi. Irama thus combines "the rate of temporal flow and temporal density"; and the temporal density is the primary factor.

One way to think of Irama is to use the most consistently struck instrument in the gamelan, the saron panerus (or peking). In some pieces, it plays once per note in the balungan (such as played by the saron barung). In others, it may play twice as often, or four times, as the notes of the balungan are more spread out. This corresponds to a slower Irama. In most cases, the more spread out the balungan is, the longer it takes to reach a gong ageng.

There are five Irama:

Irama number	Irama name	Saron panerus beats per balungan note
1/2	Irama lancar	1
I	Irama tanggung	2
II	Irama dados (or dadi)	4
III	Irama wilet	8
IV	Irama rangkep	16

In slower Irama, there is more space to be filled, and typically elaborating instruments become more important.

Each Irama can be played in three Laya ("tempi"):

- Seseg ("fast"),
- Sedeng ("medium")
- Tamban ("slow").

Frequently, a change of Laya signals a new section.

== See also ==
- Gamelan
- Gamelan notation
- Music of Indonesia
- Music of Java

== Bibliography ==
- Spiller, Henry. Gamelan: the traditional sounds of Indonesia. ABC-Clio, 2004. ISBN 978-1-85109-506-3
- Sumarsam. Gamelan: cultural interaction and musical development in central Java. University of Chicago Press, 2nd Edition, 1996. ISBN 978-0-226-78011-5
