= Kempyang and ketuk =

Indonesian musical instrument used in Gamelan

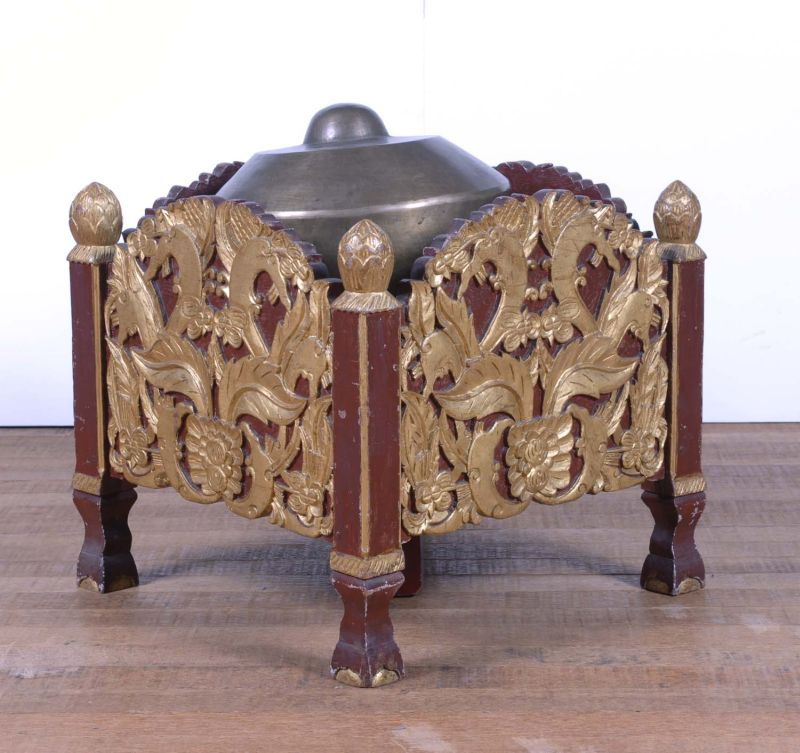
- Classification: Percussion instrument; Idiophone; Gong
- Developed: Indonesia

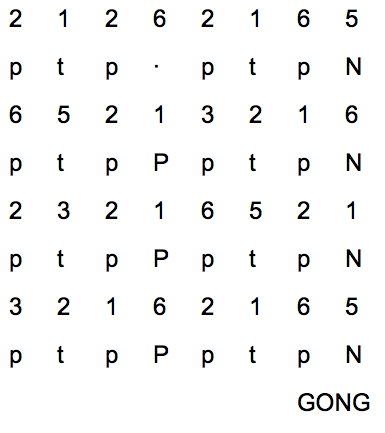
Ladrang form on the balugan instruments. GONG = gong ageng

The kempyang and ketuk are two instruments in the gamelan ensemble of Indonesia, generally played by the same player, and sometimes played by the same player as the kenong. They are important beat-keepers in the colotomic structure of the gamelan. Depending on the structure, they play different, repeating patterns every gongan. Not all structures use the kempyang, but the kempyang is never played without the ketuk.

They are shaped like bonang, but are generally placed in their own frame (rancak). The kempyang is pitched higher (about one octave), although it depends if they are in the pelog or slendro set. Both have a central boss like the bonang, but the kempyang has a rounder top (like the higher bonangs), while the ketuk has a flat top (like the lower bonangs).

In the common numerical notation, kempyang strokes are marked by "-" while the ketuk is marked by "+". The ketuk pattern is used to classify longer gendhing types, where it refers to the number of ketuk strokes in a nongan.

== See also ==
- Gamelan
- Bonang
- Kempul
- Music of Indonesia
- Music of Java
