= Pathet =

Indonesian musical notation used in Gamelan

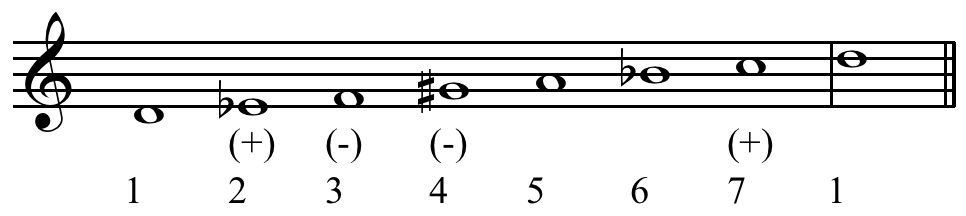
Pelog approximated in Western notation.

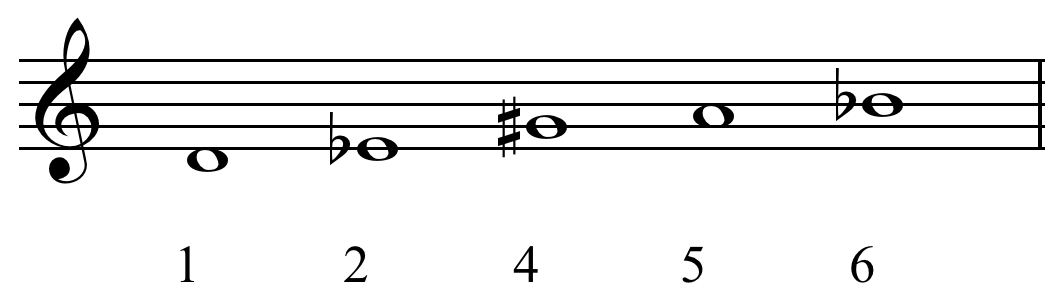
Pelog bem.

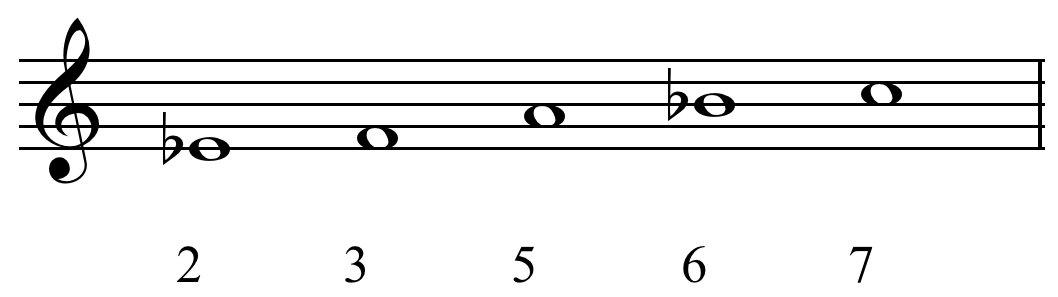
Pelog barang.

Pathet (Javanese: ꦥꦛꦼꦠ꧀, romanized: Pathet, also patet) is an organizing concept in central Javanese gamelan music in Indonesia. It is a system of tonal hierarchies in which some notes are emphasized more than others. The word means '"to damp, or to restrain from" in Javanese. Pathet is "a limitation on the player's choice of variation, so that while in one pathet a certain note may be prominent, in another it must be avoided, or used only for special effect. Awareness of such limitations, and exploration of variation within them reflects a basic philosophical aim of gamelan music, and indeed all art in central Java, namely, the restraint and refinement of one's own behaviour." Javanese often give poetic explanations of pathet, such as "Pathet is the couch or bed of a melody." In essence, a pathet indicates which notes are stressed in the melody, especially at the end of phrases (seleh), as well as determines which elaborations (cengkok and sekaran) are appropriate. In many cases, however, pieces are seen as in a mixture of pathets, and the reality is often more complicated than the generalizations indicated here, and depend on the particular composition and style.

== Classification ==
In Javanese music there are traditionally six pathet, three for each tuning system, pelog and slendro. The systems correspond to each other in emphasized pitches, as in the table given below (given in kepatihan notation), although of course the numbers do not indicate the same frequencies.

Pélog Pathet	Corresponding Slendro Pathet	Stressed "tonic"	Strong "dominant"	Avoided in slendro	Rare in pélog
Pélog lima	Slendro nem	2	5	1	7
Pélog nem	Slendro sanga	5	1	3	7
Pélog barang	Slendro manyura	6	2	5	1

(Note: Pelog lima and slendro nem are not musically parallel.) The musical relationship between pathet makes it possible to transpose some pieces from one pathet to the other, as well as to share cengkok at different transpositions. Some of the direct transpositions of balungan: from manyura to sanga by dropping notes one scale degree; from manyura to pelog barang by changing pitch one to seven, and altering 2126 to 2756; from slendro sanga to pelog nem by playing the slendro balungan in pelog.

Mantle Hood's writing on pathet, no longer considered authoritative, proposed that in pélog, 4 is a "dissonant" pitch; elaborating instruments such as gendér and gambang often play the adjacent pitches 3 or 5 instead. The "avoided" notes are rare as seleh. The terms "tonic" and "dominant," are used by some sources. The Javanese use the terminology padhang and ulihan, or question and answer, to describe the semantics of a balungan or lagu (melody). Another system of designation proposed by Mantle Hood, was Gong Tone I for the stressed note, Dasar for the strong note, and Gong Tone II for another strong note involved in the cadential system.

Two other terms are sometimes encountered for pélog: pathet bem and pathet manyura. Pathet bem, meaning the pelog pathet that use pitch one as the first degree of the scale 1 2 3 5 6, is used as a general term to indicate pélog pathet nem and lima (especially in Yogya, where that distinction is not traditionally made [?]). Mantle Hood found through an analysis of gendhing in these pathet that they remain distinct in their typical patterns. The other pathet, pélog pathet manyura, also called pélog nyamat, is a direct transfer from slendro manyura into pélog, without the substitution of 7 for 1 as in pathet barang. It occurs in a small collection of gendhing.

== Cadences ==
The scholar and ethnomusicologist Mantle Hood proposed certain ideas based on a single octave displacement of these characteristic cadences. In his early Western writing on pathet, he surmised that one of the clearest distinctions between the pathet are the typical cadences that appear in the balungan, particularly at the ends of phrases marked by kenong or gong. These ideas have been largely disproven as Javanese performance practice has been better understood, and later research has shown that matters of pathet and lagu are represented more clearly by multi-octave instruments such as rebab and voice.

- Slendro
  - Nem: 6-5-3-2
  - Sanga: 2-1-6-5
  - Manyura: 3-2-1-6
- Pélog
  - Lima: 5-4-2-1 (old) or 5-3-2-1 (new)
  - Nem: 2-1-6-5
  - Barang: 3-2-7-6
  - Manyura: 3-2-1-6

== Use ==
In an evening of wayang, the pathet of the accompaniment in progresses in throughout the performance. In slendro, the sequence is from nem to sanga to manyura; in pelog, from lima to nem to barang. Very early wayang was in slendro only, but it is now common to combine slendro and pelog in wayang, dance, and klenengan (pure music) performances. The sections of the wayang are also associated with stages of life and a range of emotions; this influences the feeling, playing, and interpretation of pieces in each pathet.

Many pieces can be transposed from one pathet to another. Sometimes this involves some substitutions of notes. Many cengkok and sekaran have corresponding versions in different pathet.

In each pathet there are several pathetan, melodies in free meter which are often said to express the essence of the pathet. In wayang, these are based on the melodic structure of solo songs performed by the dhalang, such as suluk or ada-ada. When gamelan is played independently of wayang, pathetan are played instrumentally by the soft elaborating instruments—rebab, gender, gambang, and suling—at the beginning or conclusion of pieces, following the contour of the associated vocal melody.

== See also ==
- Gamelan
- Cengkok
- Seleh
- Sekaran
- Music of Indonesia
- Music of Java
