= Kenong =

Indonesian musical instrument used in Gamelan

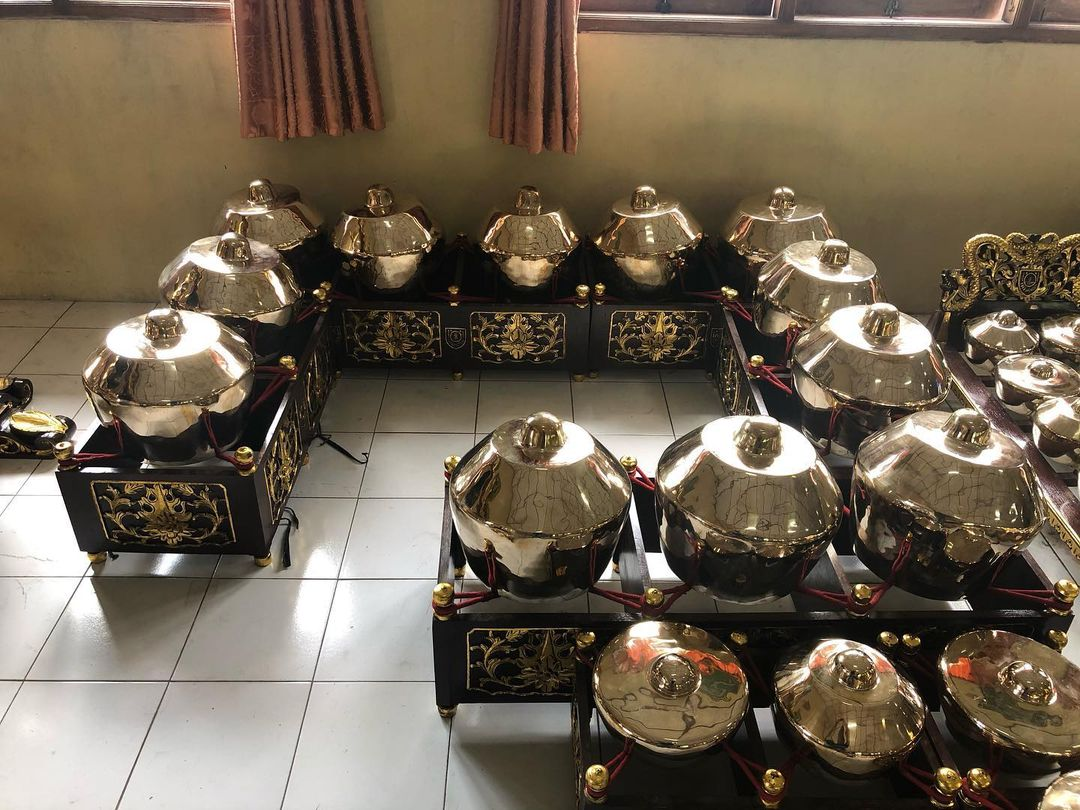
- Classification: Percussion instrument; Idiophone; Gong
- Developed: Indonesia

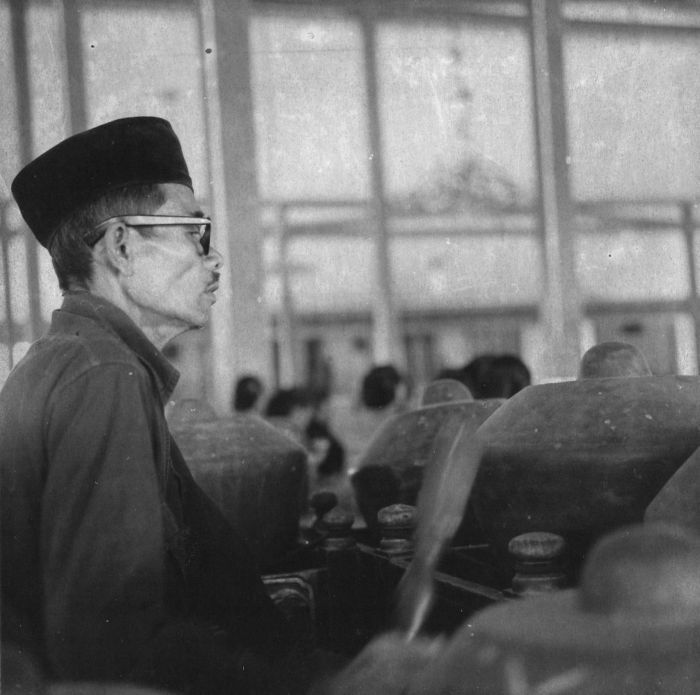
Man playing kenong in a gamelan orchestra (1966)

The Kenong is a musical instrument of Indonesia used in gamelan music. It is a kind of gong and is placed on its side. It has the same length and width. Thus, it is similar to the bonang, kempyang, and ketuk, which are also cradled gongs. Kenongs are generally much larger than the aforementioned instruments. However, the kenong has a considerably higher pitch. Its sound stands out because of its unique timbre. Kenong sticks are taller than those of the bonang. The kenong is sometimes played by the same player as the kempyang and ketuk.

Most of the instruments in the gamelan 'family' are originally from Java, Indonesia, but they spread throughout Southeast Asia.

The kenong usually has a specific part in the colotomic structure of the gamelan, marking off parts of a structure smaller than a gongan (the space between each strike of the gong ageng). The interval of each part between strikes of a kenong is called a nongan. In a fast, short structure these can only last a second or so; in a longer gendhing, particularly in a slow irama, they can last several minutes. There are usually two or four nongans in a gongan.

Kenongs are usually in sets of one for each note, although sometimes other notes can be substituted for any missing notes. A full gamelan would include sets for slendro and pelog. The boxes (rancak) for the kenong are usually for one or two; these are then put in a line or curve surrounding the player. There are generally more of them than there are kempuls, as all gamelan structures require kenong but not necessarily kempul.

== See also ==
- Gamelan
- Bonang
- Kempul
- Kempyang
- Music of Indonesia
- Music of Java
