= Gong ageng =

Indonesian musical instrument

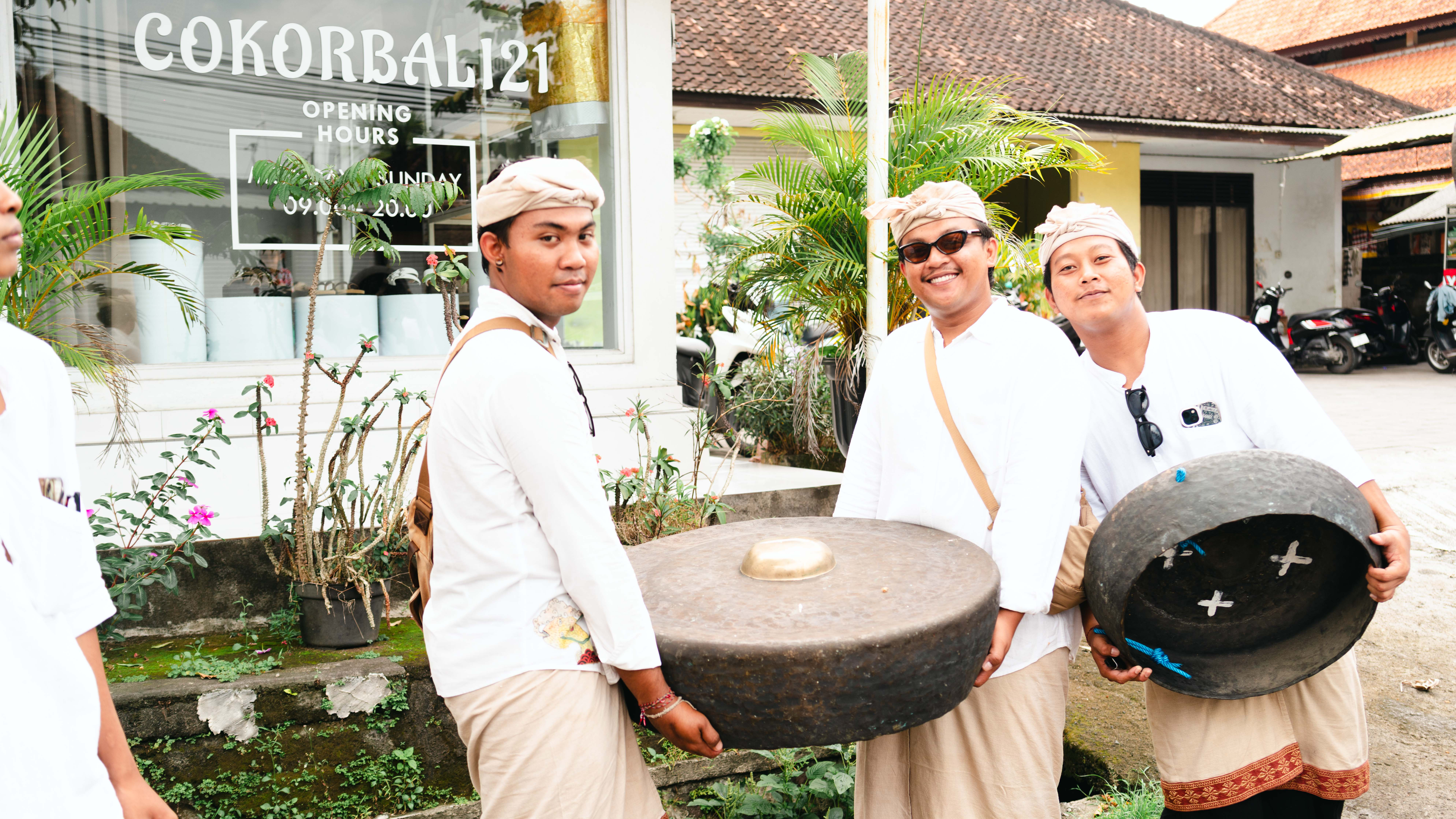
Young men carry traditional bronze gongs in preparation for a ceremonial procession in Denpasar, Bali, Indonesia.

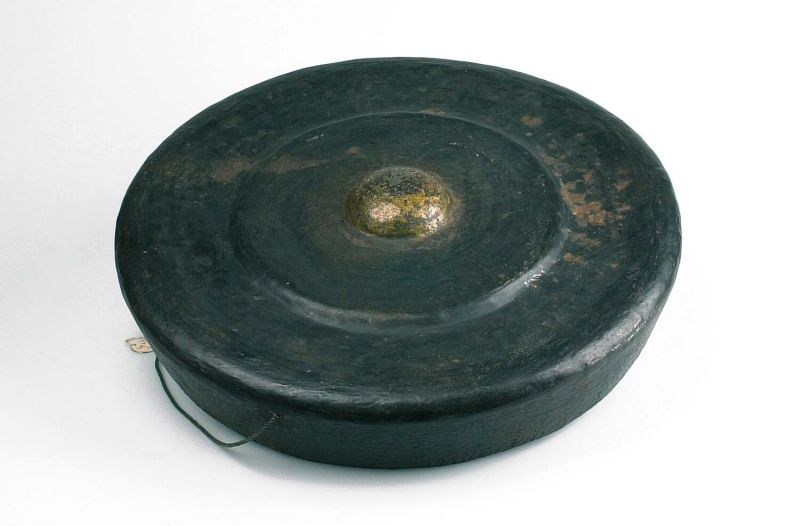
Gong Ageng in Javanese Gamelan ensemble

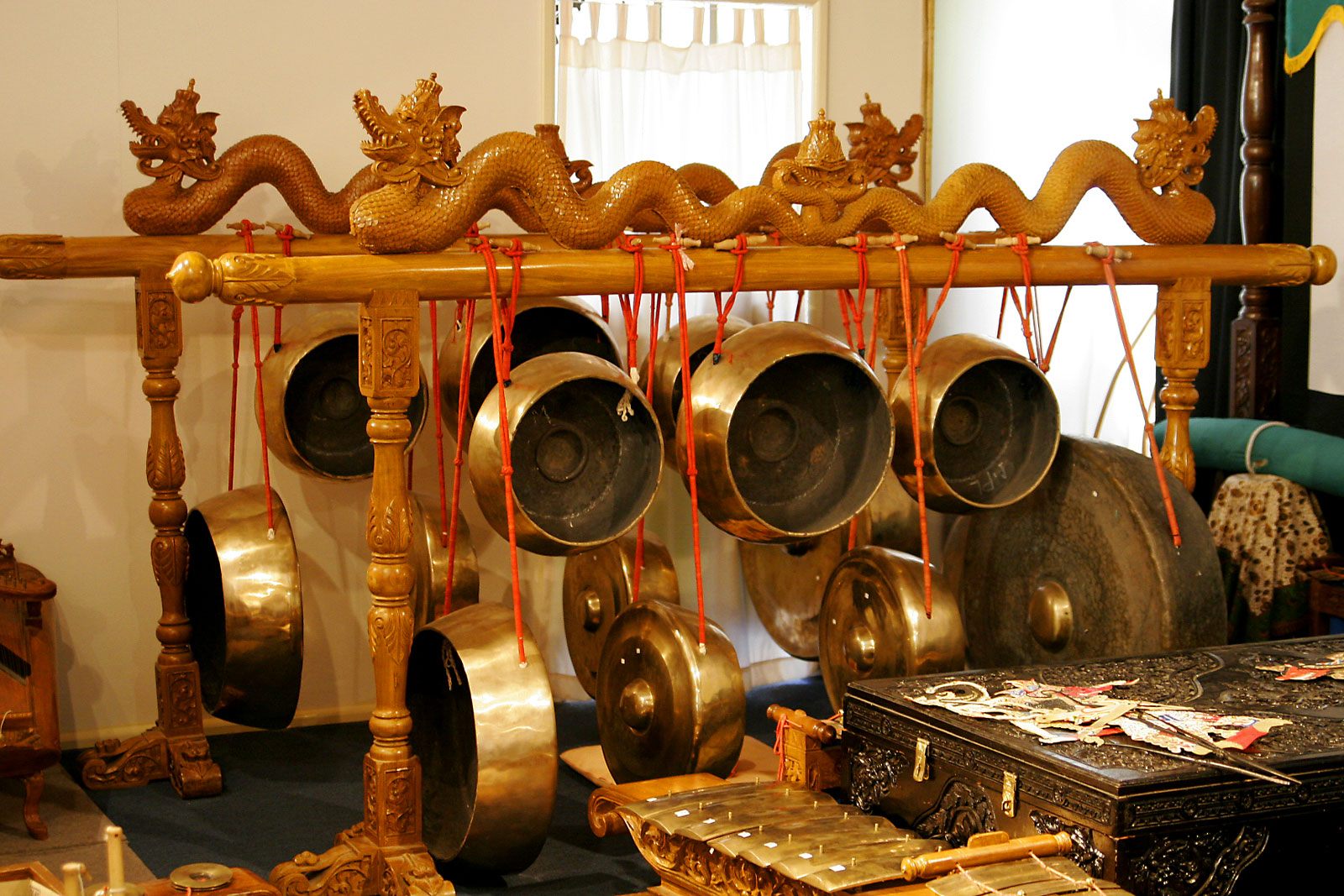
Two gong sets; pélog scale set and sléndro scale set. Smaller kempul gongs are suspended between gong ageng (largest, right-side) and its gong suwukan (left, facing rearward).

The gong ageng (or gong gedhe in Ngoko Javanese, meaning large gong) is an Indonesian musical instrument used in the Javanese gamelan. It is the largest of the bronze gongs in the Javanese and Balinese gamelan orchestra and the only large gong that is called gong in Javanese. Unlike the more famous Chinese or Turkish tam-tams, Indonesian gongs have fixed, focused pitch, and are dissimilar to the familiar crash cymbal sound. The gong ageng is circular, with a conical, tapering base of diameter smaller than the gong face, with a protruding polished boss where it is struck by a padded mallet. Gongs with a diameter as large as 135 centimeters (53 inches) have been created in the past, but gongs larger than about 80 centimeters (31 inches) are more common today, especially to suit the budget of educational institutions.

There is at least one large gong in each gamelan, but two are common and older gamelans may have three or more. Each gong ageng usually has its own name, which may be bestowed upon the entire set of instruments. The gong ageng is considered the most important instrument in a gamelan ensemble: the soul or spirit of the gamelan is said to live in the gong. Gong ageng are often proffered ritual offerings of flowers, food, and/or incense before performances or each Thursday evening to appease spirits believed to live in and around it.

Commonly, less expensive iron gong ageng or a slit-type gong are made to fulfill the role of the bronze gong for poorer regions and villages, though at the loss of sound quality. The cost of expertly pure cast and beaten bronze has caused a rise in bronze-plated and bronze-laminated iron gongs created for the undiscerning expatriate.

== Acoustics ==
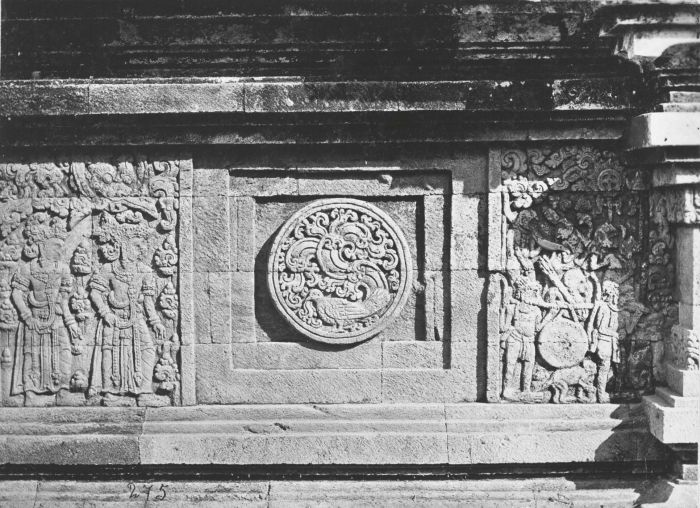
Two men (right) are lifting the gong depicted on the 13th-century temple reliefs at the Candi Induk, Panataran temple complex in East Java, Indonesia

Traditionally, it is the first of the instruments to be made. A highly skilled gong-smith will smelt and cast, then supervises the hammering process, but will be solely responsible for the final fine tuning of the gong ageng pitch- the rest of the ensemble is tuned (and named) according to the qualities of the gong ageng. It is the single most costly and lengthy item to fabricate- and often requires multiple re-castings due to stress-cracks created in the beating process of forming it and undesired tonal or timbre qualities. The pitch desired is very deep, distinctly pitched rumble that sound like thunder or the "rolling waves of the sea". Slight differences in the opposite halves of a gong create a desired "beating" in the sound. It is named according to subjective poetic descriptive images for different speeds of beats, comparing slow beats with waves of water and faster beats with Bima's laughter (Bima is one of the Pandawa brothers in the Mahabharata epic).

The gong is fabricated to resonate at the lowest thresholds of human hearing (20 Hz to 20,000 Hz). Actual pitch will vary, but a fine gong ageng of example of the Nusantara Museum of Delft was measured to have a fundamental tone of 44.5 Hz. The Gong Ageng has about a dozen prominent exponentially decaying partials, with some component frequency ratios that closely correspond to harmonics and others that are enharmonic. Many of the partials have a slow amplitude and frequency modulation of a few Hertz, and a faster modulation around 20 Hz. The instruments of the gamelan are then fabricated on the fundamental tone of the gong ageng pitch is basis of the slendro pitch "6" (enam, or nem) of It is typically pitched to match the 6 of the gamelan.

== Function ==
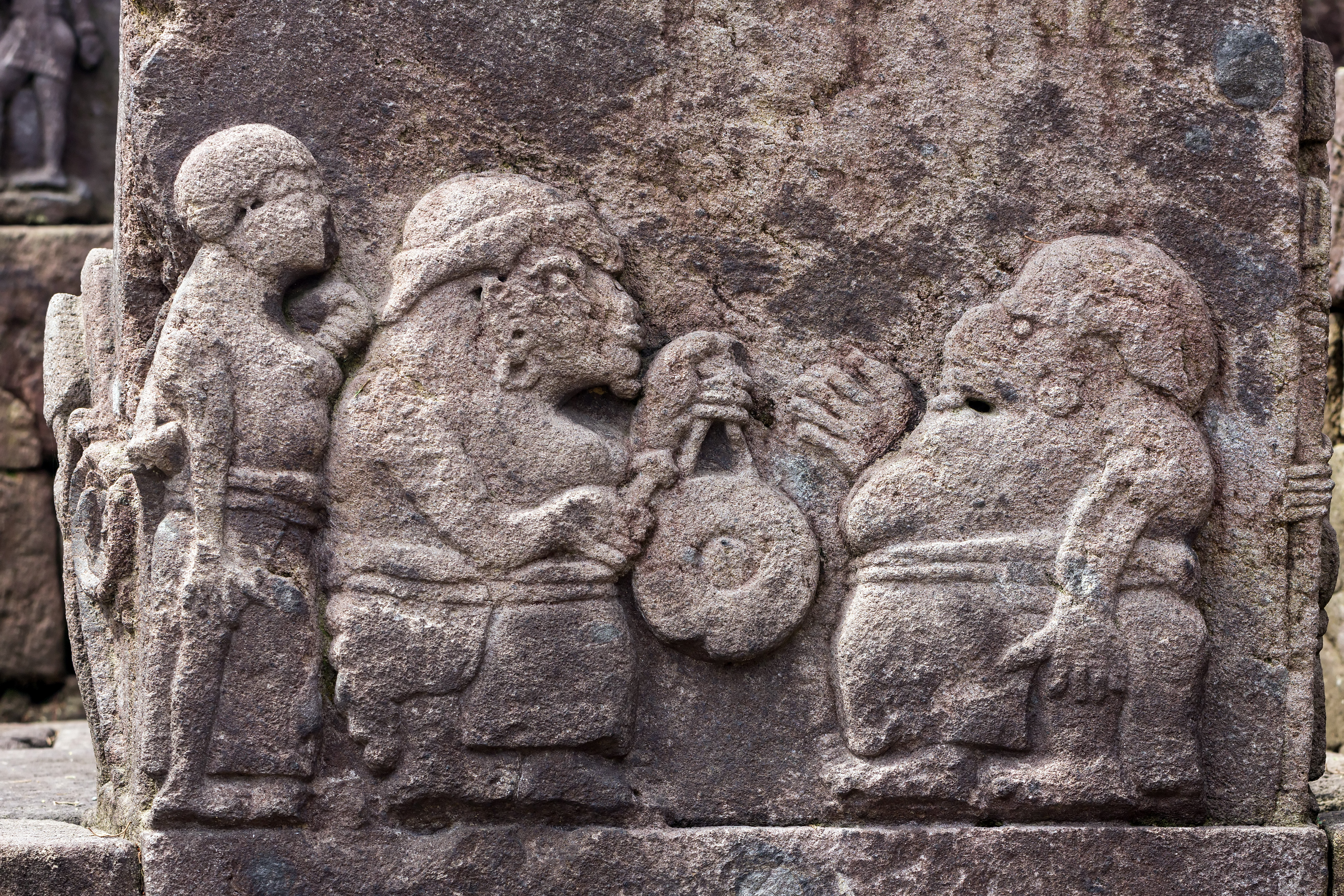
A Gong depicted on the 15th-century temple reliefs at the Candi Sukuh in Central Java, Indonesia

Gong ageng demarcates the larger phrase structure or gongan. Within the gongan structure, Between, the gong suwukan and kempul punctuate the subdivisions of time. A gongan is the time span between the gong ageng strikes, which are subordinate to the tempo: irama, and length of the structure (bentuk). the gongan is the longest time-span in the colotomic structure of gamelan.

In larger gendhing (compositions), only the gong ageng is employed. Some gamelan sets for cost considerations will use the gong ageng for both pélog and sléndro scale systems. A truly full set in a keraton(palace) will have two gong ageng.

The gong suwukan or gong siyem is the smaller gong in the set used for smaller phrases. It is generally pitched higher, and at different pitches for pélog and sléndro. Frequently gamelans will have more than one gong suwukan, for different ending notes, and different pathet.

Most common is a 1 for pathet sanga and lima, and 2 for pélog pathet nem and barang, and sléndro pathet nem and manyura. Usually a 1 can be played for gatra ending in 1 or 5, and a 2 for 2 or 6. A few gamelans include a gong suwukan 3 as well.

The goong ageung plays a similar role in Sundanese gamelan (e.g. degung). The kempur in Balinese gamelan is similar to the gong suwukan (and not to be confused with the Javanese kempul). In other Indonesian and Philippine cultures, its analog is the agung.

== Cultural aspects ==
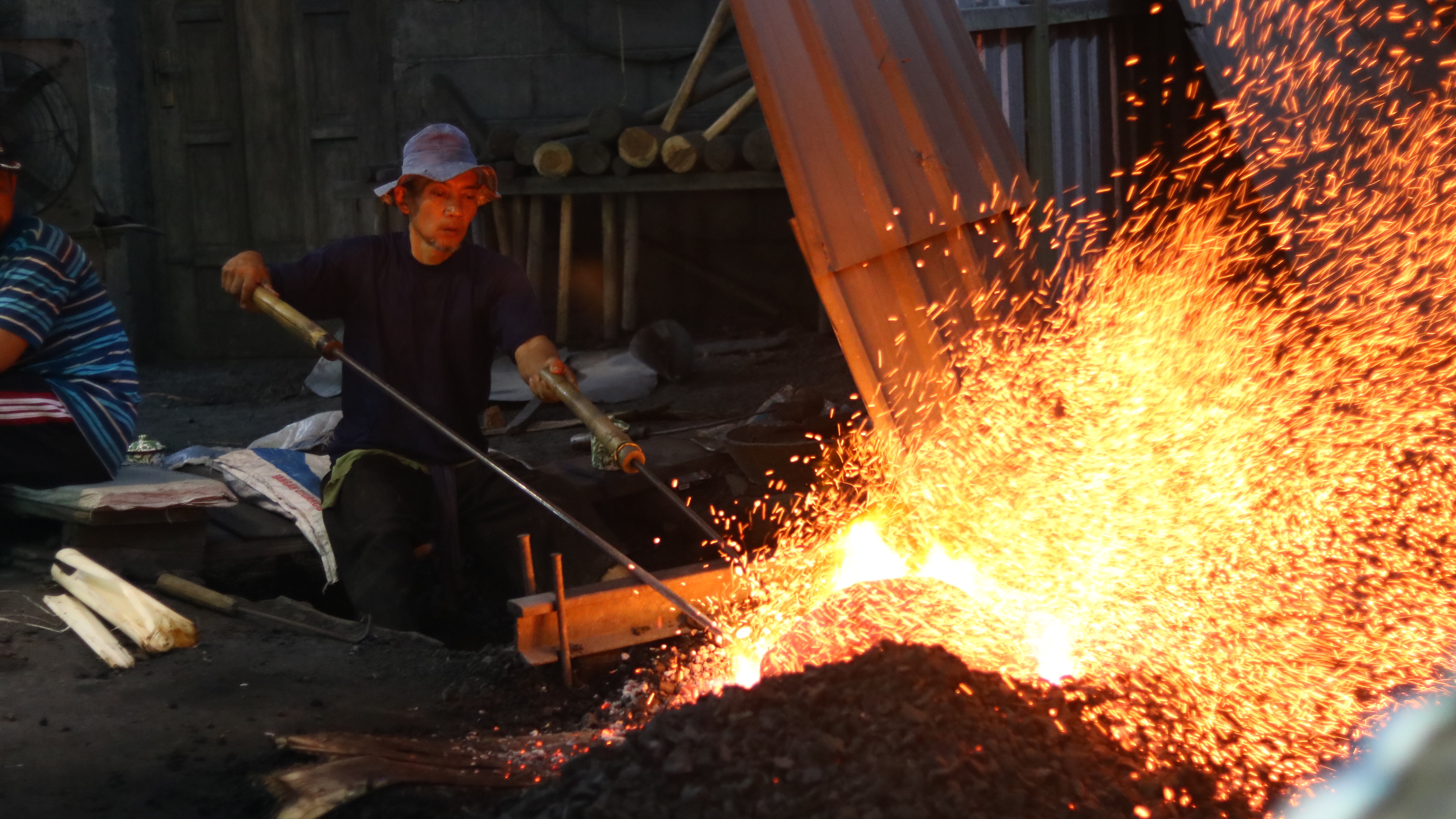
Pande (Gamelan Maker) is burning Gong in Besalen in Central Java, Indonesia

The gong ageng is central and fundamental to the gamelan orchestra. Similes between the gong ageng are made in relations to Indonesian, and particularly the Javanese and related Balinese society cultures. A very large (and expensive) gong ageng is often commissioned for prestigious state-sponsored projects. Two famous ones include the Surabaya Naval Dockyard statue (weighing over 2000 kg) and in the seaside resort of Ancol in Jakarta (approximate diameter 3 meters, weight several thousand kilogram). These two former gong ageng can be heard a distance of 20 kilometers out to sea.

On auspicious or important occasions a gong ageng is often struck, just as in Western society a ribbon may be cut or a champagne bottle smashed (commissioning of a building or ship, launching a project, finalizing a major business deal, and similar occasions).

In the houses of the wealthy, mainly Javanese aristocrat families of Jakarta, gong ageng are used to herald the arrival of guests. Less important guests are heralded by the kempul.

== See also ==
- Gamelan
- Kempyang
- Kempul
- Bonang
- Music of Indonesia
- Music of Java
