= Music of Java =

Javanese traditional music, Indonesia

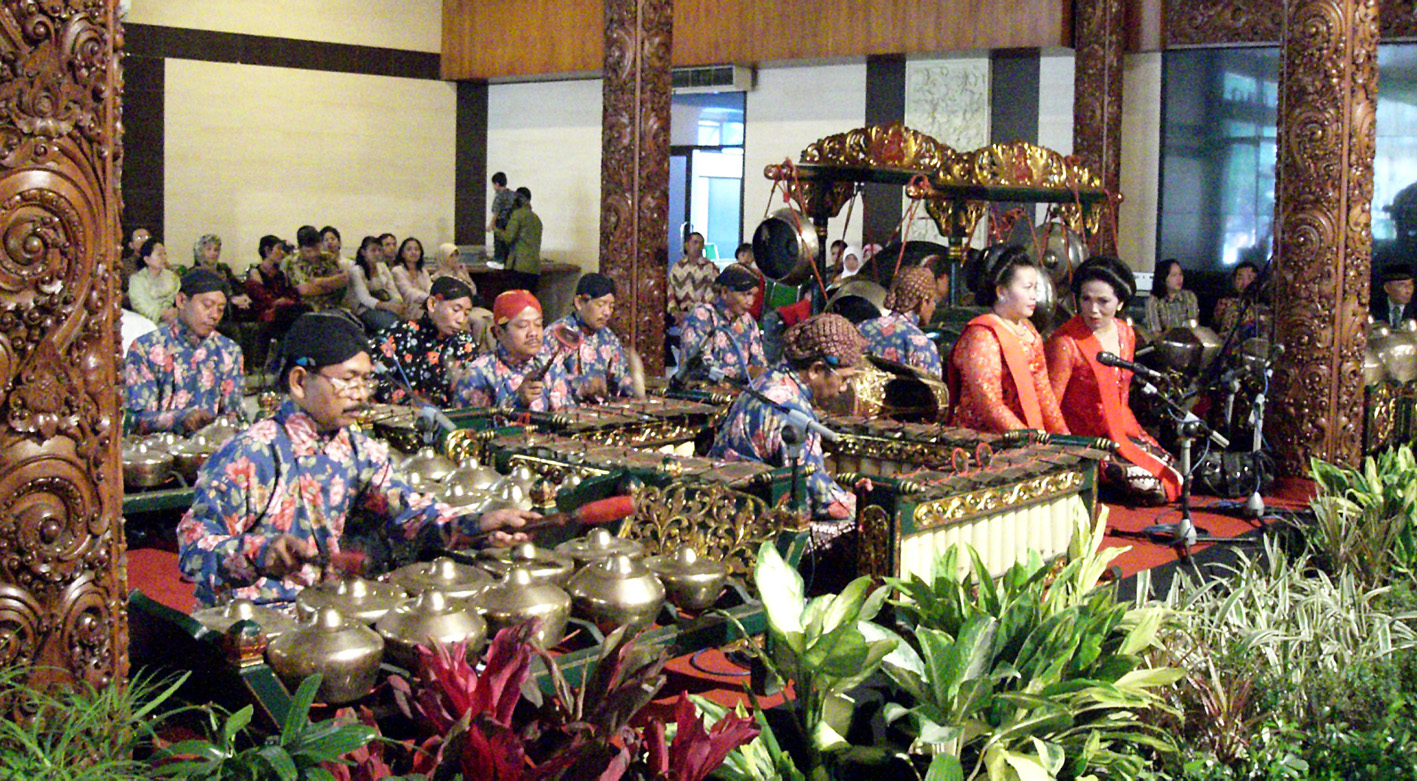
Javanese gamelan ensemble performance during traditional Javanese Yogyakarta style wedding ceremony at Sasono Utomo, Taman Mini Indonesia Indah, Jakarta, Indonesia.

The Music of Java embraces a wide variety of styles, both traditional and contemporary, reflecting the diversity of the island and its lengthy history. Apart from traditional forms that maintain connections to musical styles many centuries old, there are also many unique styles and conventions which combine elements from many other regional influences, including those of neighbouring Asian cultures and European colonial forms.

== Gamelan ==
The gamelan orchestra, based on metallic idiophones and drums, is perhaps the form which is most readily identified as being distinctly "Javanese" by outsiders. In various forms, it is ubiquitous to Southeast Asia. In Java, the full gamelan also adds a bowed string instrument (the rebab, a name illustrative of Islamic influence), plucked siter, vertical flute suling and voices. The rebab is one of the main melodic instruments of the ensemble, together with the metallophone gendér; these and the kendang drums are often played by the most experienced musicians. Voices usually consist of a male chorus gerong, together with a female soloist pesindhen; however, the voices are not usually featured in court gamelan (as opposed to wayang kulit, shadow puppet theatre) and are supposed to be heard discreetly in the middle of the orchestral sound. In these abstract pieces, the words are largely secondary to the music itself.

There are two tuning systems in Javanese gamelan music, slendro (pentatonic) and pelog (heptatonic in full, but focusing on a pentatonic group). Tuning is not standard, rather each gamelan set will have a distinctive tuning. There are also distinct melodic modes (pathet) associated with each tuning system. A complete gamelan consists of two of sets of instrument, one in each tuning system. Different gamelan sets have different sonorities, and are used for different pieces of music; many are very old, and used for only one specific piece. Musical forms are defined by the rhythmic cycles. These consist of major cycles punctuated by the large gong, subdivided by smaller divisions marked by the striking of smaller gongs such as kenong, kempul and kethuk. The melodic interplay takes place within this framework (technically called "colotomic structure").

== See also ==
- Music of Indonesia
- Sundanese music
- Music of Bali
- Music of Sumatra
