= Pelog =

Indonesian musical scale used in Gamelan

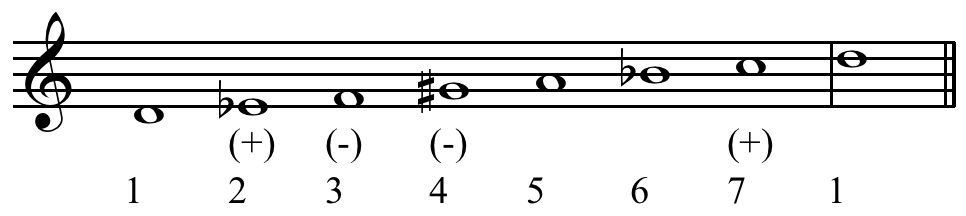
Pelog approximated in Western notation.

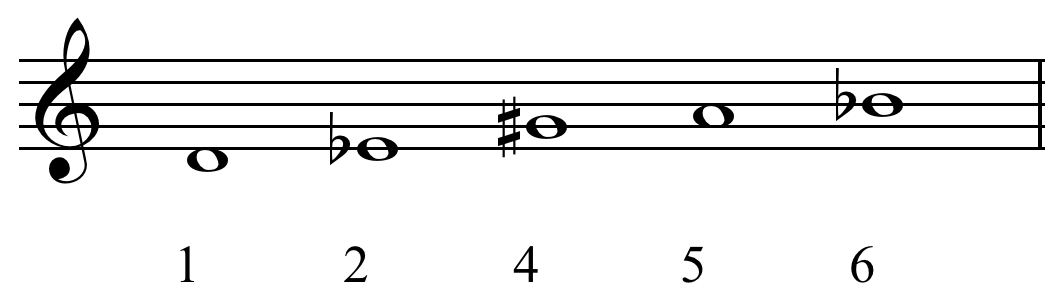
Pelog bem.

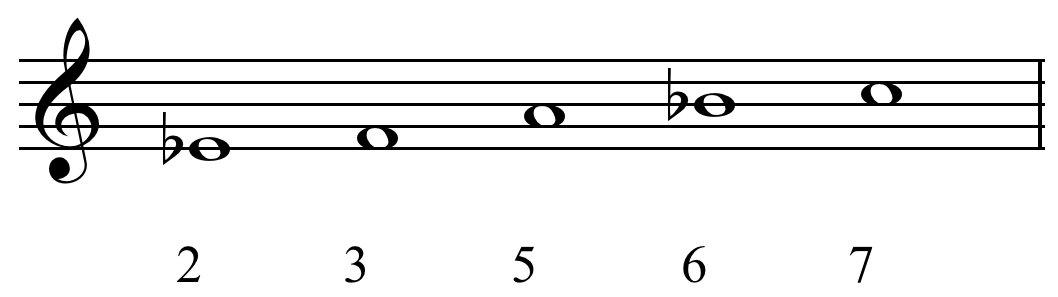
Pelog barang.

Pelog selisir
Pelog selisir scale, played on a gangsa

Pelog (Sundanese: ᮕᮦᮜᮧᮌ᮪, romanized: Pélog /pelog/, Javanese: ꦥꦺꦭꦺꦴꦒ꧀, Balinese: ᬧᬾᬮᭀᬕ᭄, romanized: Pélog /pelok/) is one of the essential tuning systems used in gamelan instruments that has a heptatonic scale. The other, older scale commonly used is called slendro. Pelog has seven notes, but many gamelan ensembles only have keys for five of the pitches. Even in ensembles that have all seven notes, many pieces only use a subset of five notes, sometimes the additional 4th tone is also used in a piece like western accidentals.

== Etymology ==
Pelog is a Javanese term for one of the scales in gamelan. In Javanese, the term is said to be a variant of the word pelag meaning "fine" or "beautiful".

== Tuning ==
Since the tuning varies so widely from island to island, village to village, and even among gamelan, it is difficult to characterize in terms of intervals. One rough approximation expresses the seven pitches of Central Javanese pelog as a subset of 9-tone equal temperament. An analysis of 27 Central Javanese gamelans by Surjodiningrat (1972) revealed a statistical preference for this system of tuning.

As in slendro, although the intervals vary from one gamelan to the next, the intervals between notes in a scale are very close to identical for different instruments within the same Javanese gamelan. This is not the case in Bali, where instruments are played in pairs which are tuned slightly apart so as to produce interference beating. The beating is ideally at a consistent speed for all pairs of notes in all registers, producing stretched octaves as a result. This contributes to the very "agitated" and "shimmering" sound of gamelan ensembles. In the religious ceremonies that contain gamelan, these interference beats are meant to give the listener a feeling of a god's presence or a stepping stone to a meditative state.

Sundanese gamelan has its own pélog tuning. Both Javanese-like pélog and Sundanese pélog (degung) coexist in Sundanese music. Javanese-like pélog has the 2nd note more neutral (Javanese 2 [ro], Sundanese 4 [ti]) and Degung has the 1st note leaning (closer to Javanese 1 [ji], Sundanese 5 [la]). The Javanese pélog is only found in gamelan pélog instruments, while degung is found widely on any instrument, such as calung, angklung, and gamelan degung.

Notation equivalents for pélog in both Javanese and Sundanese notation:

1 2 3 4 5 6 7 ji ro lu pat mo nem pi

5 4 3 -3 2 1 +5 la ti na ni mi da leu

== Usage ==
=== Java ===
Although the full pelog scale has seven tones, usually only a five-tone subset is used (see the similar Western concept of mode). In fact, many gamelan instruments physically lack keys for two of the tones. Different regions, such as Central Java or West Java (Sunda), use different subsets. In Central Javanese gamelan, the pelog scale is traditionally divided into three pathet (modes). Two of these, called pathet nem and pathet lima, use the subset of 1, 2, 3, 5, and 6; the third, pathet barang, uses 2, 3, 5, 6, and 7. The remaining two notes, including 4 in every pathet, are available for embellishments on most instruments, but they do not usually appear on gendér, gambang, or interpunctuating instruments.

The notes of the pelog scale can be designated in different ways; In Central Java, one common way is the use of numbers (often called by their names in Javanese, especially in a shortened form. An older set uses names derived from parts of the body. Notice that both systems have the same designations for 5 and 6.

| Number | Javanese number | | Traditional name | |
| | Full name | Short name | Full name | Literal meaning |
|---|---|---|---|---|
| 1 | siji | ji | bem | head |
| 2 | loro | ro | gulu | neck |
| 3 | telu | lu | dhadha | chest |
| 4 | papat | pat | papat | four |
| 5 | lima | ma | lima | five |
| 6 | enem | nem | nem | six |
| 7 | pitu | pi | barang | thing |

=== Sunda (West Java) ===
In Sunda, the notes of gamelan degung have one-syllable names. A peculiarity of Sundanese solfège is that scale degrees are given in descending order.

| Sundanese pelog degung | Javanese pathet lima |
| 1 (da) | 6 |
| 2 (mi) | 5 |
| 3 (na) | 3 |
| 4 (ti) | 2 |
| 5 (la) | 1 |

=== Bali ===
In Bali, all seven tones are used in gamelan semar pegulingan, gamelan gambuh, and gamelan semara dana (a seven-tone gamelan gong kebyar ensemble). All seven tones are rarely heard in a single traditional composition.

Like in the music of Java, five-tone modes are used, which are constructed with alternating groups of three and two consecutive scale degrees, each group being separated by a gap. Unlike Java, there are only five names for the notes, and the same five names are used in all modes. The modes all start on the note named ding, and then continue going up the scale to dong, deng, dung and dang. This means that the same pitch will have a different name in a different mode.

==== Classical modes ====
The three most common and well-known modes are selisir, tembung and sunaren. Selisir is the most often encountered, being the tuning of the popular Gamelan gong kebyar, and may be considered the "default" pelog scale.

Two other modes, baro and lebeng, are known from gambuh and semar pegulingan, but are rarely used and more loosely defined. Baro has at least four different interpretations; one common one (3-4-5-7-1, according to I Wayan Beratha and I Ketut Gede Asnawa) is shown below. Lebeng contains all seven tones, but only in semar pegulingan; in gambuh it is pentatonic, but has a more elusive character.

| | Classical Balinese modes | | | | |
| Tone | Selisir | Tembung | Sunaren | Baro | Lebeng |
|---|---|---|---|---|---|
| 1 | ding | dung | — | dang | ding |
| 2 | dong | dang | dung | — | dong |
| 3 | deng | — | dang | ding | deng |
| 4 | — | ding | — | dong | deung |
| 5 | dung | dong | ding | deng | dung |
| 6 | dang | deng | dong | — | dang |
| 7 | — | — | deng | dung | daing |

==== Other modes ====
With the advent of the gamelan semara dana and renewed interest in seven-tone music, a number of other modes have been discovered by extending the 3/2 rule to other possible positions. They fall into two groups: the pengenter modes and the "slendro" modes.

The two "slendro" modes, slendro gedé and slendro alit are named for their resemblance to slendro proper. In these modes, ding is often placed at the first note of a two-note sequence in the 3-2 pattern, reflecting common practice in slendro ensembles. Slendro gedé is associated with the tuning of gender wayang, while slendro alit is identified with the four-tone scale of gamelan angklung.

The pengenter modes were discovered as theoretical extrapolations by I Nyoman Kaler. They exist only in recent modern compositions.

| Tone | Slendro gedé | Slendro alit | Pengenter gedé | Pengenter alit |
|---|---|---|---|---|
| 1 | — | (dong) | dong | deng |
| 2 | deng | — | deng | — |
| 3 | dung | deng | — | dung |
| 4 | dang | dung | dung | dang |
| 5 | — | dang | dang | — |
| 6 | ding | — | — | ding |
| 7 | dong | ding | ding | dong |

== See also ==
- Cengkok
- Music of Indonesia
