= Balungan =

Core melody of a gamelan composition

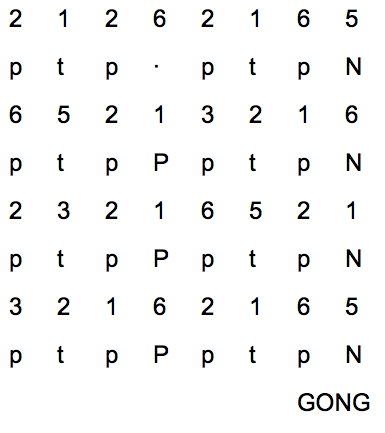
Ladrang form on the balungan instruments. GONG = gong ageng. balungan approximation without colotomy

The balungan (Javanese: skeleton, frame) is sometimes called the "core melody" or, "skeletal melodic outline," of a Javanese gamelan composition. This corresponds to the view that gamelan music is heterophonic: the balungan is then the melody which is being elaborated. "An abstraction of the inner melody felt by musicians," the balungan is, "the part most frequently notated by Javanese musicians, and the only one likely to be used in performance."

The group of instruments which play the closest to the balungan are sometimes also called the balungan, or balungan instruments. These are the saron family and the slenthem. In many pieces, they play the balungan. However, they can also elaborate on the parts in a variety of techniques. It is possible that there is no instrument playing the balungan, although many musicians claim that the balungan is still present.

The term has been a source of some controversy, as various writers may define it differently. Sometimes it is identified with the melody played on the saron (whose range is limited to an octave), but sometimes it is identified with a wider tessitura that is implied by the patterns on other instruments. This multi-octave melody is the one given in kepatihan notation, the cipher notation used for gamelan pieces.

Lagu is a related term, which is used by Sumarsam and is sometimes translated as "inner melody." It can mean the multi-octave balungan, or a more implicit melody. There is no consensus on the use of either term, and they may be used differently by different writers or in different contexts.

== Types of balungan ==
The gatra (music) in a balungan have a distinctive pattern of notes and rests (pin), which are classified into several categories (given with an example in kepatihan notation):

- Balungan mlaku (or balungan mlampah) do not use rests:

2321 3123

- Balungan nibani uses rests between each note, having notes only on the strong beats:

.5.2 .3.5

- Balungan nggantung ("hanging balungan") sustains a note, especially by playing it twice at the beginning of a gatra, or emphasizing it on the third (weak) beat:

11.. ..1.

- Balungan pin mundur use rests at accented places, thus using syncopation:

3.2. 1.23

- Balungan ngadal (or balungan rangkep) subdivides the beats (keteg) of a gatra, notated by the overline, which means play twice as fast:

2̅5̅3̅5̅2̅3̅1

Different gendhing structures prefer certain types of gamelan. The implications of motion and stasis are important in achieving the mood of a composition.

== Other uses ==
Balungan is also the name of a journal published by the American Gamelan Institute.

== Definitions ==
Sumarsam argues that the use of the term, beginning directly after the introduction of notation, arose from the use of notation, theory, and pedagogy.

- "The center of gravity of a gamelan composition, and the improviser's guideline, is a melody known as the 'skeleton' or 'framework' (balungan), played in a slow, even rhythm on [the]...saron."
- "If the balungan is the same, then the elaborating parts should be the same."
- "The instrumental melody called balungan (literally, 'skeleton', 'outline')."
- "The balungan gendhing is important-if not, indeed, the most important-factor in the practice of karawitan, because as the framework of the gendhing it gives a composition its basic shape, and is used as a frame of reference and point of departure for the playing of the gamelan instruments."
