= Merong =

The merong is a section of a composition for Javanese gamelan, a musical ensemble featuring metallophones, xylophones, drums, and gongs. Specifically, the merong is the initial part of a gendhing. A merong cannot be played on its own, but must be followed by a minggah, which may also take the form of a ladrang or other colotomic structure.

The merong is the longest of the sections used in gamelan composition. It consists of a single gongan lasting four nongan, but the nongan can be of different lengths. Merong are then classified according to the number of kethuk strokes in a nongan in each section. The merong does not use the kempyang or kempul. There are two patterns for the kethuk in the merong, arang ("infrequent, sparse") and kerep ("frequent"). Both have the kethuk play only at the end of a gatra, but in the kerep pattern, it is at the end of all odd-numbered gatras, whereas in the arang, it is at the end of the gatras of doubled odd numbers (that is, gatras 2, 6, 10, 14, etc.).

For example, consider a "gendhing kethuk 2 kerep minggah kethuk 4." This means that in the merong, there will be two kethuk strokes that happen on odd-numbered gatra. The structure would then look like:

...T .... ...T ...N
...T .... ...T ...N
...T .... ...T ...N
...T .... ...T ...G

where "." indicates no interpunctuating instrument plays, p indicates the stroke of the kempyang, T the ketuk, N the kenong, and G the simultaneous stroke of the gong and kenong. Thus, in each section, the gong plays once, the kenong divides that into four parts, and then that is divided into parts according to the given structure. Here, in each part, each nongan lasts 16 beats (keteg), and thus the gongan lasts 64.

That was a fairly short example; a "kethuk 4 arang" merong, for example, would look like:

.... ...T .... .... .... ...T .... .... .... ...T .... .... .... ...T .... ...N
.... ...T .... .... .... ...T .... .... .... ...T .... .... .... ...T .... ...N
.... ...T .... .... .... ...T .... .... .... ...T .... .... .... ...T .... ...N
.... ...T .... .... .... ...T .... .... .... ...T .... .... .... ...T .... ...G

and thus a nongan would last 16 gatras (64 beats), and a gongan 64 gatras (256 beats). Obviously, in a long structure like that, especially at a slow tempo, a single gongan may last many minutes.

The merong section may include a ngelik, which would also have the length of a single gongan.
