= List of gamelan ensembles in the United States =

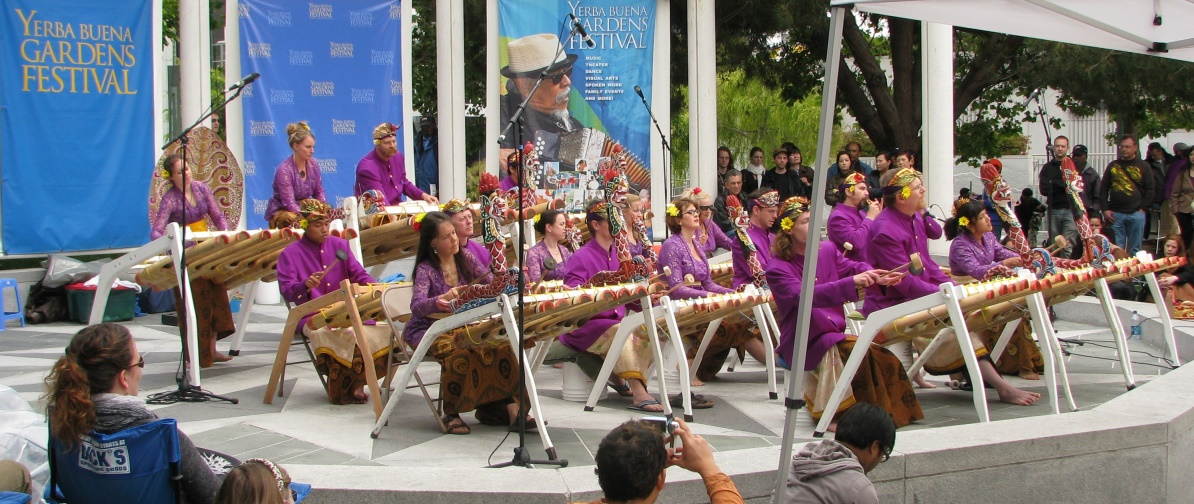
Gamelan Sekar Jaya, the first community-based Balinese gamelan in the United States, performing jegog (bamboo gamelan) music in San Francisco

There are more than 100 gamelan groups in the United States. A gamelan is a musical ensemble from Indonesia, typically from the islands of Bali or Java, featuring a variety of instruments such as metallophones, xylophones, drums and gongs; bamboo flutes, bowed and plucked strings. Vocalists may also be included. The earliest appearance of a gamelan in the U.S. is considered to be at the World's Columbian Exposition in Chicago in 1893; this set of instruments is still at the Chicago Field Museum. The first academic program to include the playing of gamelan was established by Mantle Hood at UCLA in 1958.

There are actively performing gamelan groups in roughly two thirds of the states in the U.S., using instruments made in the Indonesian regions of Java, Bali, Sunda (West Java), Banyumas, and/or North America. Many schools, universities and other institutions in North America own sets of gamelan instruments, and there are increasing numbers of community-based ensembles as well.

The earliest directory of gamelan in North America was compiled by Barbara Benary in 1993 for Ear Magazine, which included 98 sets (not all with active players); since then the number has increased steadily.

== List by state ==
| State | City | Name | Instruments | Repertoire | Notes |
|---|---|---|---|---|---|
| Alabama | Auburn | Auburn University Gamelan (disbanded) | Cirebon set from the 1930s | American percussion, some Balinese percussion; some Balinese | Auburn University ensemble |
| Arizona | Tempe | Arizona State University Gamelan | Javanese slendro/pelog, bronze | Traditional Central Javanese | Arizona State University School of Music ensemble. |
| Arizona | Tucson | Fine Stream Gamelan | Javanese, Sundanese degung, Balinese gong kebyar—Iron/brass Banyumas calung - bamboo | Traditional, some American compositions. Also regional styles including Banyumas, Semarang, and angklung Banyuwangi | Community group |
| California | Arcata | Sekar Sequoia | Javanese gamelan gadhon, bronze, pelog | Traditional Solonese gadhon | |
| California | Berkeley | Gamelan Sekar Jaya (Flowering Success) | Balinese gong kebyar, angklung, gender wayang, joged, and jegog | Traditional and new music and dance by both Balinese and American artists | Founded in 1979 |
| California | Berkeley | Sari Raras / Kyai Udan Mas (Venerable Golden Rain) | Javanese | Traditional | Joint UC Berkeley and community ensemble. |
| California | Berkeley | UU Church of Berkeley Javanese Gamelan, located in Kensington. | Javanese | Traditional and new music by Javanese and American composers | Community ensemble. Performs frequently with the Mills College Javanese Ensemble "Si Darius and Si Madeleine." |
| California | Berkeley | Saih Pitu | Balinese gamelan semar pagulingan | Traditional | Joint UC Berkeley and community ensemble. |
| California | Claremont | Giri Kusuma (Flower Mountain) | Balinese gamelan gong kebyar | Traditional-instrumental and dance music from the kebyar and pelegongan repertoire | Pomona College ensemble open to students, faculty, and members of the Claremont community. |
| California | Claremont | Harvey Mudd American Gamelan | Built by Suhirdjan of Yogyakarta, Java; pelog and slendro scales, tuned to just intonation versions | Contemporary compositions | Harvey Mudd College, ensemble established in 2000. |
| California | Davis | UC Davis Gamelan Ensemble | Central Javanese Gamelan, Sundanese Gamelan Degung and Gamelan Salendro | Traditional music of West Java | Joint UC Davis and community ensemble. |
| California | El Cerrito | Sierra School Gamelan | Balinese gong kebyar | Traditional and student pieces | Prospect Sierra Elementary School student ensemble, dir. Maddie Hogan |
| California | La Mesa | Giri Nata ("Mountain Sage"); renamed in 2005, formerly Gamelan Puspa Warsa ("flower season" or "spring") | Javanese gamelan and Balinese sets include: gender wayang, genggong, suling, gambang, gong kebyar, semar pegulingan. | Traditional | A partnership of the Museum School and the Center for World Music. Founded in 1999, currently directed by Alexander Khalil and Kaori Okado. |
| California | La Verne | Gong Kyai Pramugari | Laras Pelog (complete), Bronze (Pak Kuat), from private collection of Craig Rowe (Dir.). | Solonese klenengan | Ensemble members are often drawn from Cal Arts, UCLA, various other institutions and the Indonesian community. Ensemble was named by and dedicated to Bapak Djoko Waluyo. |
| California | Los Angeles | Gamelan Kembang Atangi (Flower of Awakening) | Balinese angklung, 5-tone | Traditional angklung pieces and kreasi (contemporary works) in the angklung kebyar style | Loyola Marymount University ensemble includes students, faculty, staff, and members of the community. |
| California | Los Angeles | Gamelan Sekar Anyar (New Blossom - Balinese) and Kyai Mendhung (Venerable Dark Cloud - Javanese) | Balinese gong kebyar and Javanese | Traditional music and dance and occasionally new music and dance | UCLA Department of Ethnomusicology ensemble |
| California | Mission Hills | Bali and Beyond / Udan Arum (sweetly scented rain) | Balinese gender wayang, semar pegulingan, gamelan beleganjur (pelog), and Javanese gamelan gadon | Traditional and contemporary, wayang kulit, dance. Tantri style of chamber gamelan | Formed in 1988, directed by Maria Bodmann and Cliff DeArment. |
| California | Oakland | Mills College Gamelan Ensemble (Si Darius and Si Madeleine) - Inactive since 2024 | Javanese-style American, aluminum, built by Lou Harrison, William Colvig, and William Winant in 1980 | Traditional and American new music. | |
| California | Oakland | Gamelan-X (formerly Onepeoplevoice) | Traditional Balinese baleganjur, a 29-piece set of unique chromatic reyongs, drum set, synths, computer processing, trumpet, saxophone, flute, voice, and other instruments from around the world | Original gamelan fusion, traditional processional baleganjur, and kecak. | |
| California | Oakland | Gamelan Encinal | American Aluminum gamelan ensemble using the "Gift" gamelan using a tuning developed by Lou Harrison | focused on new music. Instruments built by Daniel Schmidt (musician), Lydia Martín, Stephen Parris, and others | Directed by Stephen Parris |
| California | Richmond | Gamelan Gadung Kasturi (Scent of the Gadung Flower) | Balinese | Traditional Balinese music and dance | Directed by Kompiang Metri-Davies |
| California | Riverside | Gamelan Kyai Telaga Semu (Venerable Lake of Illusions) | Javanese slendro and pelog (by Tentrem Sarwanto, Solo) | Traditional and contemporary | UC Riverside ensemble |
| California | San Anselmo | Gamelan Marin (Adi Luhung) | Javanese | Traditional | Community gamelan |
| California | San Diego | Gamelan at San Diego State University | Javanese | Traditional | Directed by Djoko Walujo |
| California | San Diego | Kembang Sunda | Sundanese degung | Traditional | |
| California | San Diego | Gunung Sari | Balinese angklung | Traditional | Founded and co-directed by David Harnish. Tyler Yamin, artistic director; Alex Khalil, co-director |
| California | San Diego | Puspa Warsa | Balinese angklung | Traditional | Directed by Dr. Alex Khalil, hosted and co-sponsored by The Museum School and co-sponsored by Center for World Music |
| California | San Francisco | ShadowLight Productions | Gender wayang | Balinese wayang kulit and new shadow theatre, founded in 1972 | |
| California | San Jose | Pusaka Sunda | Sundanese degung and kecapi suling; West Javanese gamelan degung | Traditional and contemporary | Formed in 1988, founded by Burhan Sukarma |
| California | San Jose | Gamelan Si Aptos | Central Javanese iron slendro set built by Pak Daliyo with added Harrison/Colvig instruments. | Traditional and contemporary | currently housed at San José State University |
| California | Santa Barbara | Gamelan Kyai Selamet | Central Javanese pelog, slendro | Central Javanese, Cirebon, West Java | UC Santa Barbara ensemble |
| California | Santa Barbara | Gamelan Sinar Surya | Cirebonese - slendro iron and Cirebonese iron pelog/degung combination | Cirebon and Sunda pelog/slendro, degung and gong renteng; Malaysian | Formerly Gamelan Northwest of Seattle |
| California | Santa Barbara | Monkey C | Javanese pelog. demung, slentem, saron, bonang, kempul, gong, kemanak. | American and varied rock covers mixed with traditional music | |
| California | Santa Cruz | Gamelan Swarasanti | Balinese angklung | Traditional and new music for Balinese angklung, especially new music by Balinese composers | A joint ensemble of UC Santa Cruz and the community. |
| California | Santa Cruz | Gamelan Anak Swarasanti (Child of Swarasanti) | Balinese angklung and beleganjur | Traditional and new music for Balinese angklung and beleganjur, including extended arrangements with electric accompaniment and treatments. | A community-based gamelan. |
| California | Santa Cruz | West Javanese (Sundanese) gamelan at UCSC | Instruments include Sundanese slendro gamelan Galuh Pakuan, Sundanese gamelan degung Nyi Arum Bandung | Traditional, wayang golek | |
| California | Tujunga | Gamelan Merdu Kumala (Beautiful Sound) | Balinese Gong Kebyar, Gambuh, Kecak, Baleganjur, Gender Wayang | A community-based ensemble founded by Hirotaka Inuzuka in 2014. Performs traditional and contemporary Balinese music professionally in the greater Los Angeles area. | |
| California | Valencia | Burat Wangi (Fragrant Offering - Balinese) and Kyai Dara Daish (Javanese) | Balinese semar pegulingan and gamelan gong kebyar, and Central Javanese | Traditional music and dance as well as New Music by American and Indonesian composers for both ensembles. | California Institute of the Arts ensembles |
| Vallejo | Gamelan Range of Light | American, made of aluminum | American/Central Javanese | Played primarily by children and young adults for school productions and summer workshops. | |
| Colorado | Boulder | Eka Mudra | Balinese gong kebyar | Traditional | Naropa Institute gamelan ensemble |
| Colorado | Colorado Springs | Colorado College Tunjung Sari | Balinese angklung | Traditional | |
| Colorado | Denver | Gamelan Tunas Mekar ("Tunas" means a stored bit of life force, such as a seed of a floral bud, and "Mekar" means to put forth. This name has given the group its sense of identity: a wayward seed, blown far from the parent plant and landing on unfamiliar soil that has nonetheless produced an amazing flower.) | Balinese angklung and semara dana | Traditional and new Balinese | A subgroup of the ensemble is gender wayang quartet Catur Eka Santi. |
| Colorado | Denver | Gamelan Manik Kusuma | Balinese angklung | Traditional and new Balinese | Metropolitan State University of Denver ensemble |
| Connecticut | Middletown | Kyai Mentul (Venerable Bouncing) | Javanese (a Jogjanese set dating from early part of century) | Traditional music and dance | Wesleyan University gamelan ensemble. A previous Javanese slendro set, Kyai Muntjar Basuki (Venerable Sparkling Fountain) is used for wayang. Instruments were made around 1964 for the World's Fair. Its pelog instruments are in use at Smith College, Northampton, Massachusetts. |
| Connecticut | New Haven | Gamelan Suprabanggo (Yale University Javanese Gamelan Ensemble) | Central Javanese, Slendro and Pelog (from Surakarta) | Traditional and contemporary pieces, wayang kulit performances | Yale University ensemble |
| Delaware | Newark | Kyai Tlogo Beruang Perak (Venerable Lake of the Silver Bear) | | | This American made gamelan was built by and directed by Professor Michael Zinn of University of Delaware. When Dr. Zinn retired, the gamelan went with him. There is currently no active gamelan at the university. |
| District of Columbia | Washington, D.C. | Javanese Ensemble of the Indonesian Embassy | Javanese, acquired c. 1954 | Traditional | Community group established c. 1979; includes both Indonesians and Americans |
| Florida | Tallahassee | Gamelan Hanuman Agung | Balinese gong kebyar, beleganjur | Traditional, new music by American and Canadian composers | Florida State University ensemble |
| Georgia | Atlanta | The Emory Gamelan | Javanese, slendro and pelog; and Balinese beleganjur | Traditional and modern | Emory University ensemble |
| Georgia | Athens | Gamelan Chandra Natha | Balinese Gong Kebyar | Traditional | University of Georgia ensemble |
| Hawaii | Honolulu | Kyai Gandrung (Javanese) and Segara Madu (Balinese) | Javanese and Balinese gong kebyar | Traditional | University of Hawaiʻi Gamelan Ensemble. The ensemble has also begun performing kecak |
| Illinois | Chicago | Chicago Balinese Gamelan (CBG) | Balinese gong kebyar | Traditional music and dance | Community ensemble, founded 2017. |
| Illinois | Chicago | Friends of the Gamelan (FROG) | Sri Sedånå, Central Javanese bronze; Nyai Panjang Sari, Central Javanese iron | Traditional Central Javanese | Community ensemble, founded 1979. |
| Illinois | Chicago | Gamelan at the Consulate General of Indonesia | Javanese bronze | Traditional | A new and large set of instruments. |
| Illinois | DeKalb | Asian Music Ensemble | Balinese angklung; Javanese, iron (Suhirjan) | Traditional and new music | Northern Illinois University ensemble |
| Illinois | Urbana-Champaign | University of Illinois Gamelan | Javanese bronze, Balinese gamelan kebyar, beleganjur, and angklung | Traditional music and dance and new compositions | University of Illinois at Urbana-Champaign student performance ensemble plus a community ensemble |
| Indiana | Richmond | Earlham College Javanese Gamelan Ensemble | Javanese, bronze slendro/pelog | Mostly traditional Solonese | Earlham College ensemble also open to community members |
| Indiana | Indianapolis | Gamelan Mojomanis | Balinese | Traditional, contemporary, and dance | Community ensemble, founded 2024 |
| Iowa | Grinnell | Kyai Biwara (Venerable Messenger) | Javanese, iron | Traditional Javanese music and dance | Grinnell College student ensemble |
| Maine | Lewiston | Mawar Mekar (Blossom of Inspiration) | Central Javanese, iron with brass, built by Mulyadi in Solo, Java, 1997 | Traditional and new | Bates College ensemble (acquired in 2001) |
| Maryland | Baltimore | The Robert Macht Gamelan Ensemble (disbanded) | Central Javanese, bronze, slendro and pelog | Traditional and contemporary American | The ensemble also performs with the Kimberly Mackin dance company. |
| Maryland | Baltimore | Gamelan Saraswati | Balinese angklung (acquired in 2001) | | University of Maryland, Baltimore County ensemble |
| Maryland | Boyds | Gamelan Wrhatnala of Boyds | Gong kebyar, gender wayang, joged bumbung, gong suling, tektekan, genggong, and godogan | Balinese traditional and new music and dance compositions | Gamelan Wrhatnala of Boyds is the sister of Gamelan Sanggar Wrhatnala Pusat Abiantuwung in Bali. Both are directed by I. G. A. Ngurah Supartha, who is also a prominent choreographer, composer and puppeteer. |
| Maryland | Landover | Art & Cultural Center of Indonesia (ACCI) | | Javanese, Sundanese, and Balinese | Since its operation in 1976, ACCI has three main departments: Indonesian Traditional Art of Music and Dance, Indonesian Authentic Shadow Puppet Theater, and Gallery of the Community Arts & Crafts. |
| Maryland | Ellicott City | Seka Genta Semara (disbanded) | Balinese 5 or 7 tone —- a unique tuning by Wayan Beratha, 1983 | Traditional semar pegulingan and angklung repertoire | Genta Pinara Pitu has 11-key gangsa and a 14-kettle terompong. It permits 4-tone slendro, 5-tone slendro, 5-tone pelog, 6-tone pelog and 7-tone pelog. |
| Maryland | Mount Rainier | Gamelan Mitra Kusuma (Flowering Friendship) | Balinese gamelan gong kebyar, gamelan angklung, and gender wayang | Traditional | Community group, founded in 1997 |
| Massachusetts | Amherst | Ensemble at Amherst College (disbanded) | Javanese | Traditional | Amherst College ensemble |
| Massachusetts | Amherst | Sundanese Gamelan | Sundanese | Traditional | Leveritt Craft Center |
| Massachusetts | Boston / Medford | Boston Village Gamelan and Tufts Gamelan Ensemble / Rinengga Sih Tentrem (Well-Made by Tentrem's Feeling of Friendship; Enhanced by Serenity) | Javanese, Rinengga Sih Tentrem (Solo, by Tentrem Sarwanto) | Traditional Solonese court traditions | The Boston Village Gamelan is now in residence at Tufts University, and rehearses together with the Tufts ensemble. It performs also occasionally on a 19th-century Solonese set owned by the Boston Museum of Fine Arts, Kyai Jati Mulya. |
| Massachusetts | Cambridge | Gamelan Galak Tika (Intense Togetherness) | Balinese pelegongan, kebyar, gender wayang, angklung Banyuwangi | Traditional Balinese and American kreasi (contemporary works) | Massachusetts Institute of Technology ensemble; founded and directed by Evan Ziporyn |
| Massachusetts | Cambridge | Gamelan Si Betty (Named to honor arts patron Betty Freeman) | Javanese style/American, extended range, aluminum (built by Lou Harrison and William Colvig in 1979) | Traditional and contemporary in various styles; new works by group members and interested composers. | Harvard University music department and community ensemble, directed by Jody Diamond since 2007. |
| Massachusetts | Northampton | Kyai Muntjar Basuki (Venerable Sparkling Fountain) | Javanese pelog (other half of set on loan from Wesleyan University) | Traditional | Smith College ensemble |
| Massachusetts | Worcester | Gita Sari (Essence of Song) | Balinese gong kebyar | Traditional and contemporary | College of the Holy Cross ensemble |
| Michigan | Ann Arbor | Kyai Telega Madu (Venerable Lake of Honey) | Central Javanese | Traditional | University of Michigan ensemble |
| Minnesota | St. Cloud | St. Cloud State University Gamelan | Central Javanese | No longer active. The Schubert Club instruments are now housed in the Landmark Center, St. Paul | |
| Minnesota | Minneapolis/St. Paul | Sumunar Gamelan and Dance Ensemble | Central Javanese | Javanese traditional (Solonese), also contemporary. | "Kyai Medharing Madu" (Venerable Flowering Honey); made by Tentrem Sarwanto of Solo, owned by The Schubert Club. An iron pelog set made by Pak Mulyadi of Solo, owned by The Schubert Club, used for school residencies. |
| Minnesota | Moorhead | Concordia College Gamelan Ensemble | Central Javanese | Javanese traditional (Solonese) | Led by Dr. Jeffrey Meyer. |
| Minnesota | Northfield | St. Olaf College Gamelan Ensemble | Central Javanese | Javanese traditional (Solonese) | Kyai Kembul, on loan from a private sponsor in Minneapolis/St. Paul since 2019. |
| Minnesota | Winona | Winona Gamelan Ensemble at Winona State University (disbanded) | Javanese. Bronze pelog / slendro made in Solo by Pak Raharjo, "Sumber Gongso" | Traditional | Winona State University ensemble in partnership with the Schubert Club of Saint Paul (loan of instruments made by John and Ferry Banks). A community/university ensemble. |
| Missouri | Kansas City | Gamelan Genta Kasturi (Ensemble of Blossoming Sound) | Balinese semaradhana (7-tone modern-style Balinese gamelan) | Traditional Balinese and new compositions | Located at the University of Missouri–Kansas City. A course in the conservatory and an active community group. |
| Montana | Bozeman | Gamelan Sekar Gunung (Mountain Flower) | Balinese gamelan angklung | Traditional Balinese and new compositions | Located at Montana State University, instruments commissioned for MSU in 1999. A university/community ensemble. |
| Montana | Missoula | UM Jaya Budaya Balinese Gamelan (Victory Culture) | Balinese Gamelan | Traditional Balinese and dance pieces Bala Ganjur | Located at the University of Montana, performed every other year at the World Rhythms Concert by the School of Music's Percussion Studio. |
| Montana | Missoula | Gamelan Manik Harum | Balinese Gamelan | Traditional Balinese and dance pieces Bala Ganjur | Missoula Community Gamelan established in 2007 |
| Nebraska | Omaha | Son of the Good Earth | Javanese, iron (Suhirjan) and Balinese gender wayang | Traditional Javanese and contemporary Western | Located at Creighton University. A community ensemble. |
| New Hampshire | Hanover | Gamelan Lipur Sih (Comforting Your Loved Ones) | Javanese bronze gadhon with kenong and extended range saron (by Tentrem Sarwanto) | Traditional and contemporary | Located at Dartmouth College |
| New Hampshire | Lebanon | Gamelan Sleeping Fox | Balinese gamelan angklung | Traditional | Location: private home, community group |
| New Hampshire | Lebanon | Gamelan Diamond Bridge | Javanese style, aluminum and stained particle board (by Daniel Schmidt) | Traditional and contemporary | Location: used for residencies at various schools in the area, lasting from one week to four months |
| New Mexico | Albuquerque | Gamelan Encantada | American - Javanese (Barbara Benary), iron Balinese selonding | Traditional Javanese music and American new music | Iron-keyed gamelan selonding instruments are from the village of Tenganan, Bali. Gamelan Encantada is rolled steel, slendro and pelog, with gongs, drums, and suling from Java. |
| New Mexico | Santa Fe | Gamelan Ensemble | Ni Giwang: Cirebonese slendro, bronze (iron gong agung) | Central Javanese and Sundanese | Santa Fe University of Art and Design student ensemble and community classes and lecture workshops. |
| New York | Annandale-on-Hudson | Hudson Valley Gamelan Ensemble comprising Gamelan Giri Mekar, Gamelan Chandra Kanchana, and the Bard Gender Consort | Balinese gong kebyar, gender wayang | Primarily traditional | Gamelan Giri Mekar, a community ensemble originally of Woodstock, NY, is now in residence across the river at Bard College. Gamelan Chandra Kanchana is primarily composed of Bard students but also has some faculty and Giri Mekar members. |
| New York | Bronxville | Gamelan Chandra Buana | Balinese gamelan angklung | Traditional | Sarah Lawrence College student and community ensemble. |
| New York | Buffalo | Nusantara Arts Sari Raras Irama | Central Javanese, bronze and painted iron; Balinese semar pengulingan and Balinese gender wayang | Primarily traditional | Founded Autumn 2015, bronze instruments acquired 2021, Balinese 2022. |
| New York | Ithaca | Cornell Gamelan Ensemble | Javanese, Balinese | Traditional, Cirebon and Sundanese, traditional angklung | Cornell University ensemble |
| New York | Kingston | Catskill Mountain Gamelan, comprising Sekar Mawar and Sekar Ligar | Sundanese degung, kacapi suling | Classical and popular | Catskill Mountain Gamelan consists of two community ensembles directed by Dr. Dorcinda Knauth. Sekar Mawar (the Rose Blossom gamelan) is a degung gamelan built in 2012 by the Bandung builder, Asep Ahum. It is named after the rose, the state flower of New York, and for its red and gold coloring. Sekar Mawar musicians perform both classical and popular Sundanese music styles. Sekar Ligar (Falling Rose Petals) is a kacapi suling ensemble that performs both traditional Tembang Sunda repertoire from the West Javanese highlands, as well as a lighter style of music called Pop sunda. |
| New York | New York City | Gamelan Son of Lion | American - Javanese, iron | American and other new music | Gamelan Son of Lion presents new music concerts in New York City and downstate New York counties. A subsidiary group, Rockland Angklung Society, plays Balinese and American pieces for gamelan angklung and is based in Rockland County, 30 min. NW of the city. |
| New York | New York City | Gamelan Yowana Sari | Semara Dana (7-toned gong kebyar) and arrangements | Balinese and American New Music; Traditional Balinese | In residence at the Aaron Copland School of Music at Queens College. Composed of students, professors, and alumn, YS performs regularly in New York City and has performed on festivals throughout the U.S. In 2018 and 2020, the group studied and performed in Pengosekan, Bali, at the home of preeminent composer I Dewa Ketut Alit. |
| New York | New York City | Dharmaswara | Balinese gong kebyar, semara dana | Traditional and New | Located at the Indonesian Consulate |
| New York | New York City | Gamelan Kusuma Laras | Javanese | Traditional | Gamelan Kusuma Laras was founded in 1983. The group consists of American and Indonesian players and rehearses on instruments owned by the New York Indonesian Consulate. |
| New York | Gamelan Giri Kusuma (Flower Mountain) | Balinese angklung, bronze | Traditional and contemporary | City University of New York/Borough of Manhattan Community College ensemble | |
| New York | Northport | Tamara and the Shadow Theatre of Java / Srikandi Gamelan Orchestra | Javanese, iron | Javanese wayang kulit with traditional style theatre music | |
| New York | Rochester | Gamelan Lila Muni (Heavenly Sound) | Balinese angklung | Traditional and contemporary | University of Rochester Eastman School of Music ensemble |
| New York | Stony Point | Rockland Angklung Society | American - Balinese angklung, iron and bamboo | Traditional and American | |
| North Carolina | Chapel Hill | Gamelan Nyai Saraswati | Javanese slendro and pelog (bronze) | Traditional and not-so-traditional | Located at University of North Carolina at Chapel Hill. A group specializing in Central Javanese repertoire whose members come from both the university and the community at large. |
| North Carolina | Cullowhee | Gamelan Kyai Tatit Ratri | Javanese slendro (iron); Sundanese degung (iron), Sundanese degung (bronze) and Balinese angklung (bronze) | Traditional and some experimental | Western Carolina University ensemble |
| North Carolina | Winston-Salem | Gamelan Giri Murti | Balinese kembang kirang (5-tone slendro with extended range) and beleganjur | Traditional and contemporary | Wake Forest University ensemble. Balinese music and dance ensemble whose members come from Wake Forest University, University of North Carolina School of the Arts, and the broader community |
| Ohio | Bowling Green | Sekaha Gong Kusuma Sari (Floral Essence Gamelan Club) | Balinese gong kebyar | Traditional, with some modern pieces such as those composed by David Harnish and student composers | Bowling Green State University ensemble, directed by Kurt Doles; the director emeritus is David Harnish. The ensemble was founded 1990, replacing an earlier gamelan with a different name that had been established in 1980. |
| Ohio | Oberlin | Kyai Barleyan (Venerable Diamond) | Javanese pelog and slendro | Traditional | The Oberlin College gamelan was a slendro set from Malang, East Java, purchased in 1970. In 1984 a pelog set was custom built to match by a Yogyakarta maker. |
| Ohio | Granville | Dwara Udyani (Doorway to the Mountain) | Balinese gamelan angklung | Traditional | Denison University ensemble |
| Oregon | Ashland | Gamelan Degung Leuwi Asih | Iron degung from Bandung | Sundanese classical degung, and contemporary American | This iron degung set was purchased by Southern Oregon University in 1999 from Bandung and is housed at SOU. |
| Oregon | Eugene | Gamelan Sari Pandhawa | Javanese slendro and pelog (Solo, Pak Tentrem) | Traditional and contemporary (Javanese and American) music | A non-profit organization providing opportunities for learning about Indonesian music and art. Performances also include wayang kulit, the shadow puppet theater. |
| Oregon | Eugene | Kyai Tunjung Mulya (Noble Lotus Blossom) | Central Javanese and Cirebon—slendro/pelog extended range—iron/brass/bronze by Suhirdjan in Yogyakarta (1999). | Traditional Central Javanese | The University of Oregon School of Music |
| Oregon | Eugene | Pacific Rim Gamelan / Suranadi Sari Indra Putra | Balinese kebyar (from Lombok) | Traditional | Also at the University of Oregon School of Music. |
| Oregon | Portland | Portland Gamelan Ensemble / Kyai Guntur Sari (gong name) / Kagok Laras (Venerable Showers of Beauty / A Different Song) | Javanese | Traditional, some American | At Lewis and Clark College; founded by Vincent McDermott in 1980 |
| Oregon | Portland | Gamelan Wahyu Dari Langit (Revelation from the Sky) | Balinese beleganjur | Traditional and modern Balinese music | Community group, founded in 2016 |
| Pennsylvania | Lehigh Valley | Gamelan Mekar Sari | Balinese | Traditional | |
| Pennsylvania | Gettysburg | Gamelan Gita Semara | Balinese | Traditional Angklung and contemporary | At Gettysburg College. The ensemble was founded by Dr. Brent C. Talbot in 2010. They perform throughout Central Pennsylvania, and artist-in-residence programs bring the instruments to local elementary schools. |
| Pennsylvania | Lewisburg | The Bucknell Gamelan Ensemble | Balinese and Javanese | Traditional | At Bucknell University. The ensemble was directed initially by Jackson Hill, until his retirement in 2007. The group was led by Bethany Collier for some time, but is currently being led by Tyler Yamin. |
| Pennsylvania | Philadelphia | Gamelan Gita Santi | Balinese angklung | Traditional | Community ensemble founded through the Philadelphia Folklore Project, 2019 |
| Pennsylvania | Pittsburgh | Iron City Gamelan | | Traditional | University of Pittsburgh ensembles. The university formerly owned a set of Balinese angklung. Members of the ensemble also perform tembang Sunda. The Sundanese Gamelan Ensemble is run by the University of Pittsburgh music department during the regular school year, and directed by Andrew Weintraub. The university also owns a set of calung (bamboo tube xylophone). The Balinese angklung gamelan was once taught aboard a ship as part of Semester at Sea, back when the university sponsored the program. |
| Pennsylvania | Pittsburgh | Kyai Tirta Rukmi (Venerable Rivers of Gold) | Javanese, iron, by Suhirdjan, 1995 | Traditional | University of Pittsburgh ensembles. The university formerly owned a set of Balinese angklung. Members of the ensemble also perform tembang Sunda. The Sundanese Gamelan Ensemble is run by the University of Pittsburgh music department during the regular school year, and directed by Andrew Weintraub. The university also owns a set of calung (bamboo tube xylophone). The Balinese angklung gamelan was once taught aboard a ship as part of Semester at Sea, back when the university sponsored the program. |
| Pennsylvania | Pittsburgh | Ligar Pasundan (The Spreading Fragrance of Pasundan) | Sundanese degung | Traditional | University of Pittsburgh ensembles. The university formerly owned a set of Balinese angklung. Members of the ensemble also perform tembang Sunda. The Sundanese Gamelan Ensemble is run by the University of Pittsburgh music department during the regular school year, and directed by Andrew Weintraub. The university also owns a set of calung (bamboo tube xylophone). The Balinese angklung gamelan was once taught aboard a ship as part of Semester at Sea, back when the university sponsored the program. |
| Pennsylvania | Swarthmore | Gamelan Semara Santi (in honor of Semar, the god of love, and Santi, the Sanskrit word for peace, to commemorate the peace-loving Quaker traditions of Swarthmore College) | Gong kebyar with gender, by Pak Beratha, 1997 | Balinese kebyar and pelegongan | Swarthmore College ensemble. |
| Rhode Island | Providence | Brown University Gamelan Ensemble | Balinese angklung, Javanese slendro/pelog (Tentrem Sarwanto) | Traditional | |
| Tennessee | Knoxville | University of Tennessee Balinese Gamelan | Balinese gamelan semar pegulingan | Traditional and New | Established in 2015. Operated by the University of Tennessee and open to the Knoxville community |
| Texas | Austin | Kyahi Rosowibowo | Slendro and pelog, built in Yogyakarta | | Established in 1998; University of Texas School of Music ensemble: (The Majestic One) |
| Texas | Denton | Percussion Department Gamelan | American-Javanese slendro, aluminum (Daniel Schmidt) | American | North Texas State University School of Music ensemble |
| Texas | Houston | Gamelan of the New Moon | Custom made set from the workshop of Midiyanto in Java | Modern and contemporary gamelan music | Established in 2018 in Houston, TX. |
| Texas | Houston | Space City Gamelan / Gamelan Swara Dewa | Javanese, bronze | Traditional central Javanese and contemporary compositions for gamelan | |
| Texas | San Marcos | Texas State Gamelan / Gamelan Lipi Awan | Balinese, bronze | Traditional Balinese and contemporary compositions for gamelan | |
| Utah | Provo | Gamelan Bintang Wahyu | Balinese from the shop of I Wayan Beratha | traditional and contemporary music of Bali | Brigham Young University ensemble |
| Vermont | Cabot | Gamelan Singing Brook | Javanese iron, brass, and bronze (80-year-old set supplemented with new instruments by Suhirdjan 2005) | Javanese, experimental, American | The Cabot School is a preK-12 public school. Students in all grades use the instruments in a residency setting and/or a semester-long class. |
| Vermont | Plainfield | Plainfield Village Gamelan / Venerable Voice of Thoom | American (Javanese style) iron (Dennis Murphy) | American and traditional | This ensemble was the first American gamelan, which began at Goddard College in 1967 and became a community group in 1980. It is now located at Dennis Murphy's farm. It also uses a second iron set built by Dennis Murphy, Venerable Small Tiger. |
| Vermont | Plainfield | Gamelan Sulukala | Javanese iron, brass and bronze (Suhirjan) | Javanese, Balinese, American, etc. | Goddard College ensemble. |
| Virginia | Charlottesville | Charlottesville Gamelan | Javanese | Traditional | This is a community-university joint ensemble associated with the University of Virginia. |
| Virginia | Christiansburg | Sweet River of Understanding | Javanese, iron | Traditional | Played by students from Radford University, Virginia Tech, the Montgomery County Orff Ensemble, and community groups. |
| Virginia | Richmond | Gamelan Raga Kusuma | Balinese semara dana (by Pande Sukerta) | Traditional and New | A community group affiliated with University of Richmond. |
| Virginia | Winchester | Angklung gamelan group | Balinese angklung (by Pak Berata) | Traditional | A community group affiliated with Shenandoah University. |
| Virginia | Williamsburg | Gamelan Tunjung Baskara (Sun Lotus) The College of William and Mary Gamelan | Full slendro | Central Javanese and American | The College of William and Mary gamelan ensemble started in 1999. The present set of slendro instruments were purchased by the college in 2004. |
| Washington | Olympia | Gamelan Degung Girijaya | Sundanese gamelan degung | Traditional degung | Evergreen State College ensemble |
| Washington | Seattle | Gamelan Pacifica | Javanese iron and bronze in pelog and slendro (Suhirjan and Tentrem); Cirebonese slendro bronze (Tentrem) | Traditional, with a focus on Central Javanese style; also modern and contemporary compositions from the international gamelan repertoire | Cornish College of the Arts ensemble in residence; a community group; formed in 1980. |
| Washington | Seattle | Cornish Gamelan Ensemble | | | Student group at Cornish College of the Arts that plays on the same instruments as Gamelan Pacifica above. |
| Washington | Seattle | Gamelan Larasati | Javanese gamelan gadhon (Solonese, Tentrem Sarwanto) | Traditional | |
| Wisconsin | Appleton | Gamelan Cahya Asri (Harmonious Light) | Balinese gong kebyar (on loan from the Robert E. Brown Center for World Music at UIUC) | Traditional gong kebyar, lelambatan | Lawrence University Balinese Gamelan Ensemble |
| Wisconsin | Madison | University of Wisconsin–Madison Javanese Gamelan Ensemble / Kyai Telaga Rukmi (Venerable Lake of Gold) | Javanese | Traditional, some new, experimental music | University of Wisconsin–Madison ensemble |
| West Virginia | Morgantown | Gamelan at West Virginia University | Balinese and Javanese | West Virginia University ensemble | |
| West Virginia | Shepherdstown | Gamelan Wrhatnala Gunung Blue Ridge | Balinese gamelan gong kebyar | Traditional, Puri Buluh Kenana Region, IGA Ngurah Supartha's compositions and SMKI/Kokar | Shepherd University student and community ensemble, founded in 2002 |
| Wyoming | Laramie | Chandra Wyoga ("Chandra" refers to the beauty of the full moon, and "Wyoga" has a double meaning indicating both "Wyoming Gamelan" and "meditation on the beauty of the full moon.") | Balinese Semar Pegulingan, acquired in 1996 | Traditional | The University of Wyoming Gamelan, Chandra Wyoga, is a community gamelan with many UW students and community members. |

== See also ==
- Gamelan outside Indonesia

== Notes and bibliography ==
- This list is based on a directory designed and first compiled by Barbara Benary in 1983, and published in a special issue of EAR magazine. A version of that list, still maintained by Benary, is at International Gamelan Directory, hosted by the American Gamelan Institute. That site also contains lists of groups in other countries as well, particularly Japan.
- "Gamelan Groups in the USA" (PDF). Archived from the original (PDF) on December 9, 2008. (301 KB) from the Embassy of the Republic of Indonesia
- Diamond, Jody & Benary, Barbara (2001). "Indonesian Music in the United States and Canada." The Garland Encyclopedia Of World Music and Dance, Vol. 3, ed. Ellen Koskoff, pp. 1011–1033.
