= Gamelan Pacifica =

Gamelan Pacifica is an American musical ensemble, as well as a non-profit music and dance foundation that focuses on cross-cultural and interdisciplinary collaboration. Formed as a community group in 1980, the group plays the gamelan, and is as of 2022 ensemble in residence at the Cornish College of the Arts in Seattle. The ensemble is directed by Jarrad Powell.

Their instruments were built by composer and instrument builder Daniel Schmidt using aluminum. The American gamelan is a Javanese-style iron and bronze double gamelan (in pelog and slendro).

The ensemble's repertoire is traditional, with a focus on Central Javanese style; also modern and contemporary compositions from within the international gamelan repertoire. Their album Nourishment contains an arrangement of Philip Glass's Glassworks (1982) opening movement; Lou Harrison's Double Concerto for Violin, Cello and Javanese Gamelan (1982); pieces by three other composers; and traditional pieces. They have performed a just 11-limit tuning pelog scale using harmonics 8, 9, 10, 11, 12, 14, and 15, used in the first movement of Lou Harrison's Scenes from Cavafy (1980), while the second movement uses a slendro based on the 7-limit intervals 8/7 and 7/6.

== See also ==
- List of gamelan ensembles in the United States
