= Dennis Murphy (musician) =

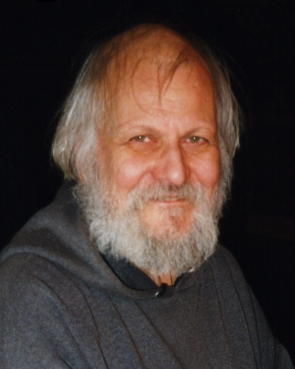
Murphy in 1996.

Dennis Murphy (January 19, 1934 – November 29, 2010) was a composer, musician, instrument maker, artist, and playwright.

Dennis Murphy was one of the fathers of American gamelan (along with William Colvig and Daniel Schmidt). Lou Harrison credited Murphy as being the first North American to build gamelan instruments. He composed numerous works and shadow plays for gamelan.

Starting around 1959 or 1960, while earning a master's degree in theory and composition at the University of Wisconsin–Madison in Madison, Murphy got interested in gamelan during a survey course which included a section on ethnomusicology. He heard a recording of Javanese gamelan and was hooked. About that time, the head of the economics department, L. Reed Tripp, returned from Java where he had been on a Ford Foundation grant. While in Indonesia, Tripp's two young sons became involved with a children's gamelan group. The boys loved it so much that their parents bought a small slendro gamelan and shipped it to their home in Madison. Then Mrs. Tripp called Bob Crane, a composition professor, and asked if he knew anyone who would like to try Javanese Gamelan. So Crane, Murphy and his wife Pat, and few more people started learning what the children could show them, and it went from there.

Shortly after this, Murphy began constructing gamelan instruments and started composing short pieces for gamelan at the same time. The whole story is described in "The Autochthonous American Gamelan", Murphy's thesis written while working towards his PhD in ethnomusicology from Wesleyan University in Connecticut. He named the gamelan "Venerable Sir Voice of Thoom" and invented an entire cosmology and artificial language to go with it (Thoomese).

Murphy started teaching at Goddard College in Plainfield, Vermont in the fall 1967. A student group using Murphy's instruments had its first performance the same year. More instruments were made with occasional student help. Instruments were hammered out of steel, or made from found objects such as a car hubcap, soup cans, or an antique milk-strainer. For a couple of years there were nine people in the ensemble (three were named Dennis.) The Goddard Gamelan performed traditional Javanese gamelan pieces along with pieces composed by Murphy and students. By the mid seventies the ensemble had grown to full complement of instruments tuned in both pelog and slendro. Students designed and constructed a building to house the instruments for rehearsals and performances.

In 1980, Goddard made major cuts to its academic programs, and the gamelan moved to the Plainfield Community Center and was renamed the Plainfield Village Gamelan. Later, the ensemble moved to Murphy's farm in Plainfield where the group continued to perform. In later years, Murphy was a faculty member with the Vermont Governor's Institute on the Arts.

Several of Murphy's students have become instrument makers. Barbara Benary while not a student of Murphy made a gamelan following directions in Murphy's thesis, and then went on to make more instruments of her own design, notably giant bar-and-resonator gongs, using one-gallon paint cans to build the tubes.

Murphy also composed pieces of chamber and choral music. He performed with the Fyre & Lightning Consort and the Nisht Geferlach Klezmer Band. He also wrote a number of plays which might be loosely categorized with the Theatre of the Absurd, among them "The Goat Painter" and "The Half-Moon Window". Many of the words and phrases in these plays, such as "Rug Sand," "Office Oil," and Hospital Ice," were taken from the page headers from the local Yellow Pages. He was a vegetarian and did not wear anything made from animal products, preferring a rope belt and flip-flops in all kinds of weather.
