= American Gamelan Institute =

Institute for promoting gamelan

The American Gamelan Institute (AGI) is an organization devoted to promoting and documenting all forms of gamelan, the performing arts of Indonesia, and their international counterparts.

The institute was founded by Jody Diamond in Berkeley, California, in 1981. The office moved to Hanover, New Hampshire, in 1990. AGI publishes scores, recordings, monographs, translations and other material. AGI has an online library with a wide variety of monographs, collections of notation, and a font for the cipher notation commonly used for gamelan, called KepatihanPro. These materials may be freely downloaded for educational use. AGI maintains an extensive archive of notation and scores for both new and traditional gamelan music, scholarly writings on gamelan, as well as audio and video recordings.

The organization's scope includes gamelan music as practiced in Indonesia as well as around the world. The journal Balungan was started in 1984 to encourage a dialog between artists and scholars involved in gamelan. Current and back issues of Balungan are on line, and many libraries have subscriptions. The sixteenth issue was printed in December 2010.

AGI also has a podcast, called Gongcast, and hosts directories of gamelan groups around the world. The directories for North America (Canada and the U.S.), are maintained by Barbara Benary. In the early 1990s, AGI produced three gamelan festivals called "Planet Gamelan".

AGI is the publisher of all gamelan works by the American composer Lou Harrison, who built gamelan instruments with his partner William Colvig.

== See also ==
- Jody Diamond
- American gamelan
- List of music organizations in the United States
