= Gamelan outside Indonesia =

Traditional ensemble music

Gamelan is a traditional form of ensemble music associated particularly with Java, Bali and other parts of the Indonesian archipelago. Gamelan traditions have also developed outside present-day Indonesia, through both historical cultural connections within the region and their later adoption in other parts of the world. These include Malay gamelan in Malaysia, which has its roots in the region's older Malay court traditions, as well as more recent gamelan traditions established in countries such as the United States, Canada and the Netherlands. While these traditions share instruments and musical principles with those found in the Indonesian archipelago, some have developed their own repertoires, performance practices and local characteristics.

== Malaysia ==
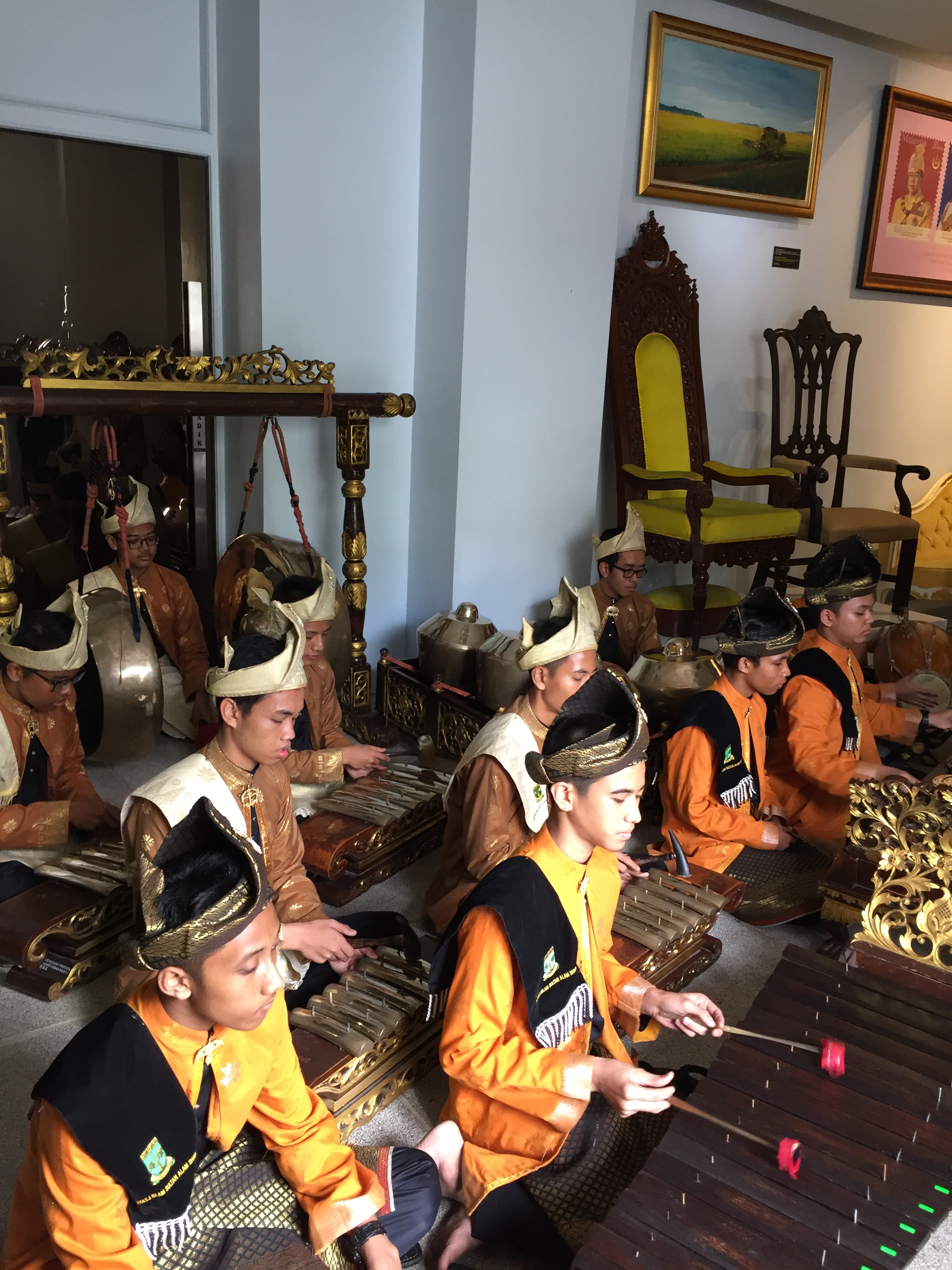
A Malay gamelan ensemble from Sultan Alam Shah Islamic College performing at the Sultan Abdul Aziz Royal Gallery in Klang

Early references to gamelan traditions in the Malay world appear in several Malay literary works. The Hikayat Banjar, a historical chronicle of the Banjar kingdom compiled in the 17th century, describes a ceremonial river procession featuring gamelan cara Malayu (Malay-style gamelan), alongside Makassarese, Chinese and Javanese forms. The Malay Annals (Sejarah Melayu), compiled in its surviving form in the early 17th century from earlier traditions, likewise mentions instruments associated with gamelan, including the sekati, celimpong and gambang, in its account of Sultan Mansur Shah's visit to Majapahit. These accounts indicate that gamelan and related musical forms were known in the Malay cultural sphere well before the development of the surviving court tradition.

The Malay gamelan tradition that developed in the Johor-Riau and Riau-Lingga court sphere became established in Pahang and later Terengganu. Known as Joget Gamelan, it developed alongside a Malay court dance tradition of the same name and was performed at royal ceremonies and court entertainments. By 1811, gamelan was established at the Pahang court, where it was performed during the royal wedding of Tengku Husain of Riau-Lingga and Wan Esah of Pahang. Under the patronage of Bendahara Wan Ahmad, later Sultan Ahmad of Pahang (1863–1914), the tradition became firmly established at the Pekan palace and came to be known as Joget Pahang. It was introduced to Terengganu in 1885 following the marriage of Sultan Zainal Abidin III to Tengku Long, daughter of Sultan Ahmad. The tradition was subsequently maintained at the Terengganu court by Tengku Ampuan Mariam and became associated with dances including Timang Burung, Ayak-Ayak and Seri Rama Balik.

Court patronage declined during the first half of the 20th century, and the tradition eventually fell into disuse. In 1966, Mubin Sheppard located a gamelan set belonging to the Terengganu court at Istana Kolam and, with the permission of Tengku Ampuan Mariam, helped revive the tradition. It was presented publicly at the Asian Music and Drama Festival at the University of Malaya in 1969 and at Temasha Seni Melayu in 1970. Malay gamelan has since been performed by cultural and educational institutions and has become part of Malaysia's performing arts heritage. The form that developed in the Malay courts has retained a repertoire and performance practice closely associated with Joget Gamelan and Malay court culture.

== Australia and New Zealand ==
See also New Zealand gamelan

Most of the gamelans in Australia are associated with universities or schools. One of the most notable is Gamelan Digul, constructed at the Digul internment camp in 1927 and brought to Australia during the Second World War.

In cities such as Melbourne, local gamelan groups take the opportunity to play in public to encourage interest both in gamelan music and in Indonesian culture.

In New Zealand, there are two gamelan sets in Wellington, one Javanese and the other Balinese. There are gamelan ensembles in Auckland, Christchurch, and Dunedin.

== Mexico ==
The first gamelan in Mexico is that owned by the Indonesian Embassy in Mexico City since the 1990s. It is a bronze Javanese slendro gamelan, but it became active after young Mexican music students were brought together by Fitra Ismu Kusumo, an Indonesian student in Mexico, and began using and playing this gamelan in 2002 and founded the group Indra Swara.

Currently in Mexico there are at least four sets of gamelan: a Surakartan-style steel slendro pelog gamelan and a Javanese slendro bronze gamelan, both owned by the Embassy of Indonesia in Mexico City; gamelan Asep Mangsa (gamelan humo del tiempo), a Javanese pelog gamelan; and gamelan Barudak, a Sundanese degung gamelan, both owned by Indra Swara.

Galleries

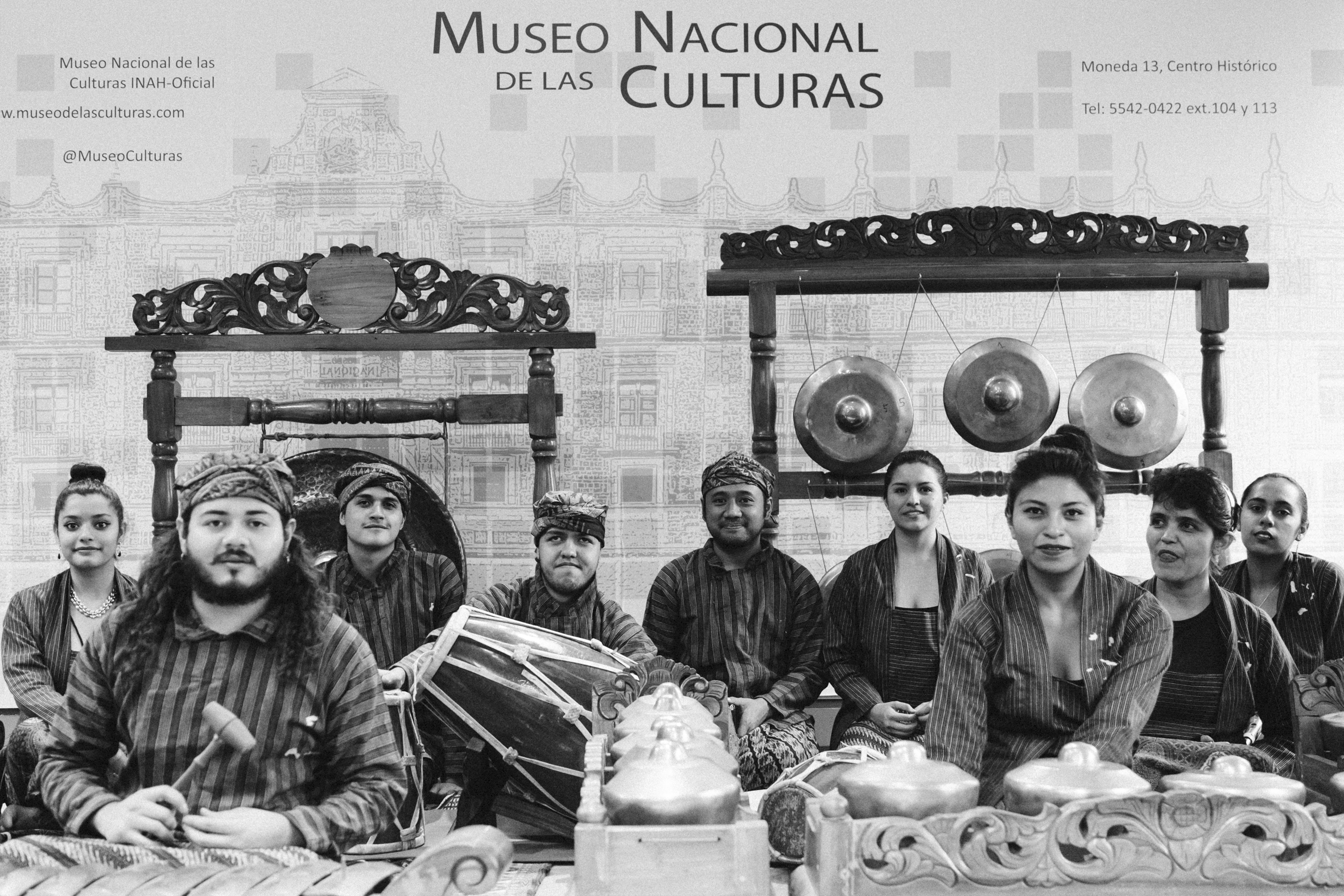
Gamelan group Indra Swara in Mexico.

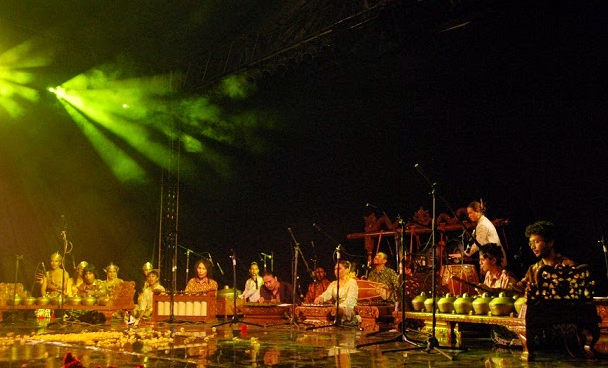
Gamelan Nyi Asep Mangsa/Humo del Tiempo Indra Swara.

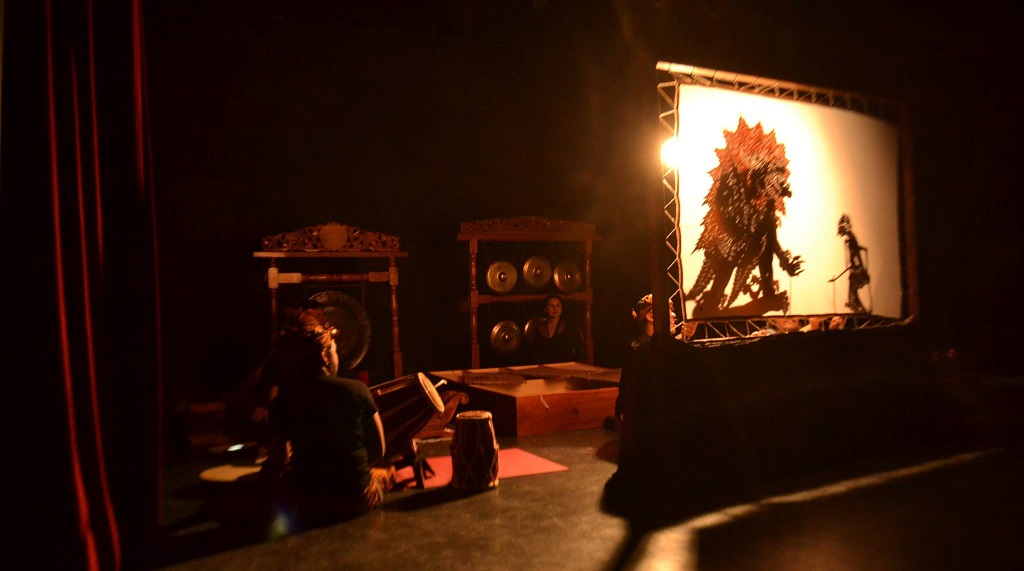
Gamelan Barudak Indra Swara México.

== The Netherlands ==
The earliest gamelan ensembles outside Indonesia appeared in the Netherlands, the colonial power that had ruled the Dutch East Indies. Before World War II, the Javanese dancer Jodjana is reported to have performed in the Netherlands with accompaniment from a small gamelan group in the Netherlands, which accompanied his performances.

Early during the war, the resistance fighter Bernardus IJzerdraat was killed by the Germans. His son Bernard then left home and in Amsterdam heard a group of stranded Javanese sailors play a gamelan at the Colonial Museum (later: Tropenmuseum).

He took lessons with them and soon started his own group with friends from his school in Haarlem. In this he received help from Jaap Kunst, who was a curator there and a important figure in the study of Indonesian music in Netherlands. Museum instruments and early commercial recordings were used as learning resources by Dutch musicians involved in gamelan practice. This became Babar Layar, one of the earliest sustained gamelan ensembles. Babar Layar played in Yogyakarta style, after Bernard studied one full year in the kraton. Mantle Hood later taught ethnomusicology in the U.S., and is regarded as a key figure in introducing gamelan to the United States.

Jaap Kunst (a Dutch musicologist) advocated the idea of polymusicality, the idea that every human can learn to understand any kind of music. So one could learn to appreciate not only western music but also Javanese gamelan, North-Indian sitar and tabla ensembles, the Japanese biwa etcetera. When asked (around 1955?) if there was any music that he could not understand, he played a record with a recording of Mexican Indians playing and singing in such a disorderly way that it was impossible to hear any structure.

In 1971, the ethnomusicologist Ernst Heins invited K.R.M.T. Ronosuripto of the Mangkunagaran palace, Surakarta to Amsterdam. This gave a new impetus to the performance of gamelan and Javanese dance in the Netherlands. Together with Mr. and Mrs. Ronosuripto, the Amsterdam Gamelan group played many concerts and performances with Javanese dance and shadow puppetry (wayang kulit). Rien Baartmans, who as a child had been taking lessons from Bernard IJzerdraat, studied wayang and kendhang with Pak Ripto, which very much stimulated his group Ngesthi Raras in Haarlem.

In 1978, the new gamelan society Naga, founded by Rob van Albada, acquired a gamelan from Solo. This gamelan was used by several groups, performing traditional and modern music on the gamelan. In the same year, Elsje Plantema (a musician specializing in Javanese gamelan) and Rien Baartmans (dhalang) founded Raras Budaya, with the aim of performing wayang kulit in Dutch. Between 1980 and 1992, Raras Budaya performed numerous wayang plays. When Naga was dissolved in 1995, their gamelan was given to Raras Budaya and is still used by gamelan groups conducted by Elsje Plantema.

After Rien Baartmans died in 1993, Elsje Plantema changed focus. Without dhalang, her new ensemble Widosari concentrated on traditional and modern gamelan music and projects with dancers, Javanese dhalangs (Sri Djoko Raharjo, Joko Susilo, and others), and composers like I Wayan Sadra, Al. Suwardi and Sinta Wullur and the combination of gamelan and Western instruments.

Nowadays, several Javanese and Balinese gamelan groups are active in the Netherlands. Javanese style groups exist in Amsterdam, Indonesian Embassy The Hague 1975 ISTIKA (Ikatan Seni Tari Indonesia di Nederland) Trainer FX Suhardi Djojoprasetyo, Renkum and Arnhem. Balinese groups can be found in Amsterdam and The Hague. A Sundanese group exists in Leiden (Leyde).

The gamelan ensemble in Delft (Museum Nusantara) has stopped playing (April 2014) because the museum was forced to close its doors after the state subsidy ended. 1975 ISTIKA (Ikatan Seni Tari Indonesia di Nederland) plays Javanese Traditional Karawitan dan Dance.

== Poland ==
The Polish band, Warsaw Gamelan Group, is perhaps the only band in this part of Europe that plays Indonesian music. WGG specialises in music from central Java.

== Portugal ==
There are two Javanese gamelans in Portugal, one in Lisbon, at Fundação do Oriente and another in Oporto at Casa da Música. Besides being used for traditional Javanese music, the gamelan at Casa da Musica has been at the centre of very innovative projects, including the development of a Robotic Gamelan. Inspired by the ideas of gamelan collective practice, Companhia de Música Teatral developed the "Gamelão de Porcelana e Cristal" with hundreds of porcelain and crystal-ware pieces in Opus Tutti, an artistic and educational project that aims to improve community musical practices for infancy.

== Spain ==
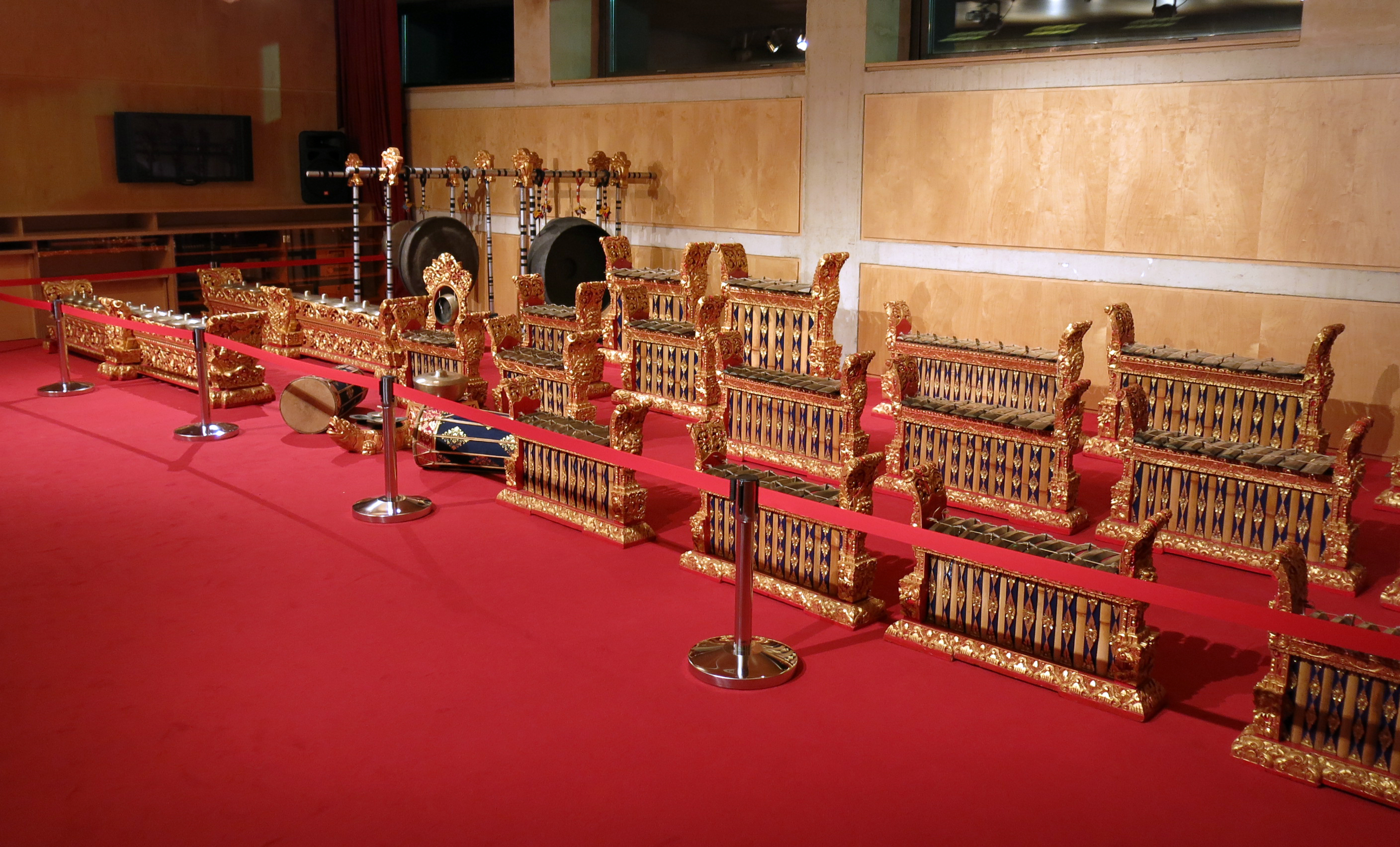
Gamelan in Museu de la Música de Barcelona.

Since July 2013, there is a complete gamelan gong kebyar set in the Museu de la Música de Barcelona. From an opening workshop given by professor Andrew Channing, the ensemble has had a stable formation called Gamelan Barasvara. The group offers regular concerts at the museum and other venues, including international festivals.

== United States and Canada ==
See also List of gamelan ensembles in the United States and American Gamelan

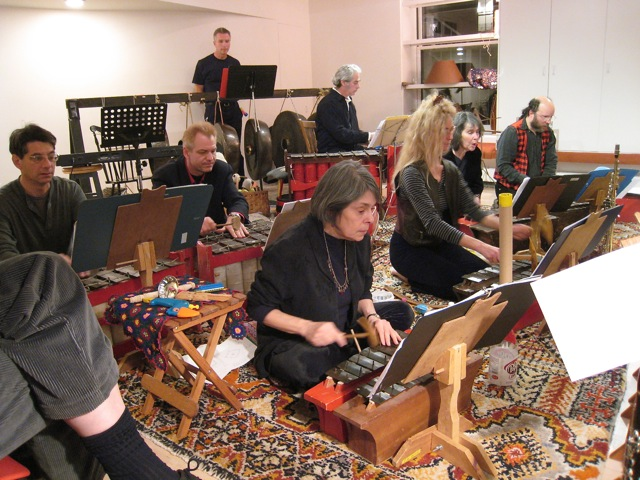
Gamelan Son of Lion, a Javanese-style iron American gamelan based in New York City that is devoted to new music, playing in a loft in Soho, Manhattan in 2007.

There are more than 100 gamelans in the United States. Gamelan music was introduced to the Western hemisphere at the World's Columbian Exposition of 1893 in Chicago. A Sundanese gamelan was imported as part of the Java Village exhibit and was acquired by the Field Museum of Natural History following the exposition. After the gamelan was restored in the late 1970s, it was used for instruction by a community arts organization, which gave its first performance in May 1978. The organization incorporated in 1980 as Friends of the Gamelan and continues to perform with two central Javanese gamelan sets that it has acquired.

Many schools, universities and other institutions in North America own sets of gamelan instruments. These gamelans are typically played by mixed-gender groups of students, a practice that is rare in Indonesia for religious reasons. Among the earliest such groups were Wesleyan University and UCLA. Established institutional gamelan ensembles in the U.S. include Gamelan Nyai Saraswati at University of North Carolina at Chapel Hill, Gamelan Burat Wangi and Gamelan Kyai Dorodasih at California Institute of the Arts, Gamelan Galak Tika at Massachusetts Institute of Technology, Gamelan Lila Muni at Eastman School of Music, Gamelan Semara Santi at Swarthmore College, Sekaa Gong Hanuman Agung at Florida State University, Gamelan Saraswati at University of Maryland, College Park, Gamelan Kembang Atangi at Loyola Marymount University, Gamelan Giri Kusuma at Pomona College, and the Javanese Court Gamelan, “Son of the Good Earth,” at Creighton University. A Gamelan is also owned by the University of North Texas called Bwana Kumala (Light of the World). The Acadia University School of Music in Nova Scotia, Canada, has access to a Gamelan Degung. Students can take an Intro to Gamelan course, or audition for the Gamelan Ensemble.

There are also professional gamelan ensembles. Gamelan Son of Lion is a group that focuses on newly composed music by both the composer-members of the group and invited composers from around the world. Gamelan Kori Mas performs Balinese music on bamboo instruments in the San Francisco bay area. Gamelan X is based in Oakland.

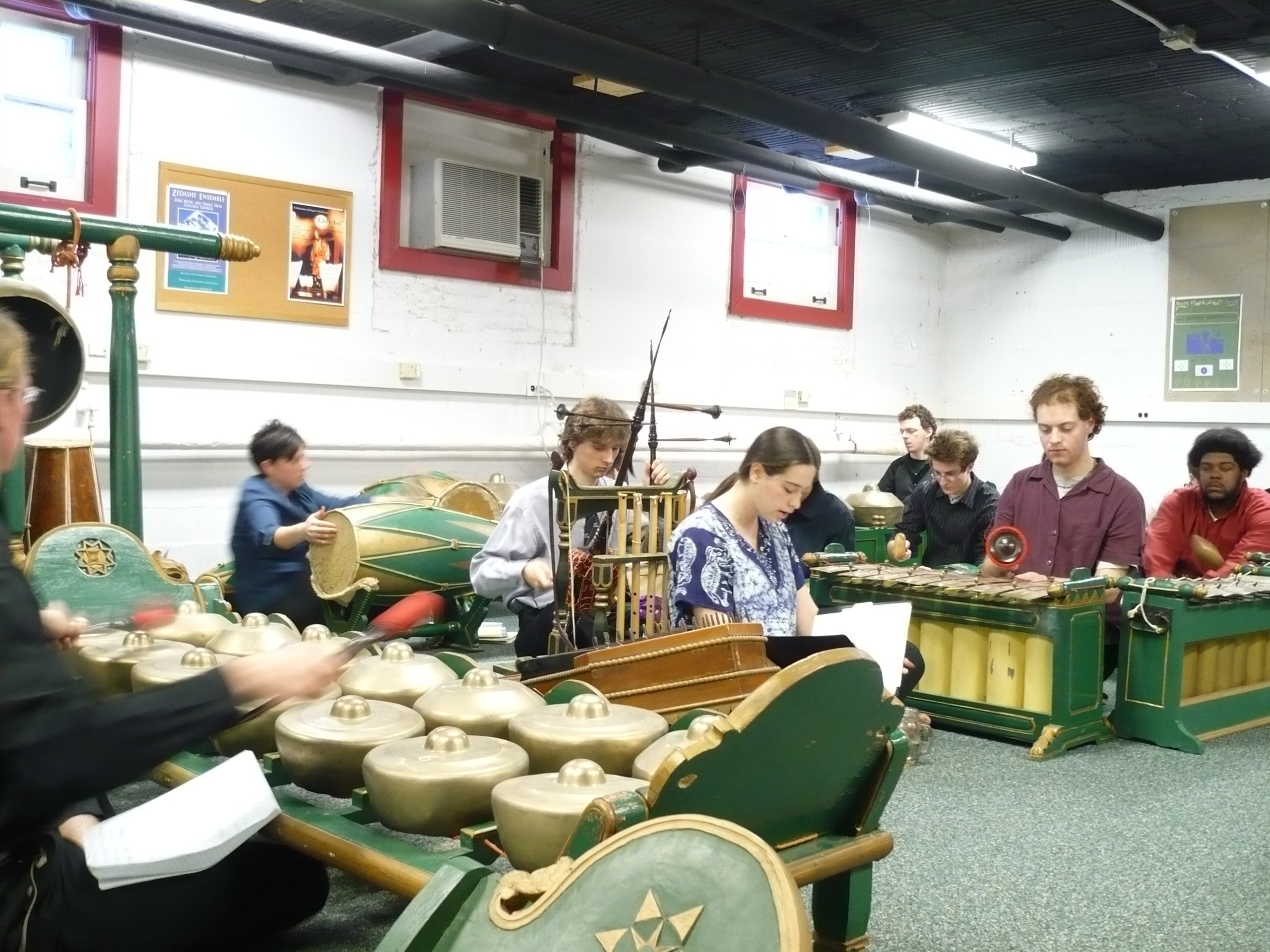
Kyai Barleyan, a Javanese gamelan at Oberlin College in Ohio. Acquired in 1970, it is believed to be the third-oldest gamelan in use in the United States.

Since 1979, a few gamelan ensembles have been organized as community arts organizations or clubs. The first Javanese community group was the Boston Village Gamelan, now known as Gamelan Laras Tentrem in Massachusetts, and the first Balinese community group was Gamelan Sekar Jaya in California. Other community Balinese gamelan ensembles are Gamelan Mitra Kusuma in Washington, D.C., Gamelan Dharma Swara at the Indonesian Consulate in New York City, Space City Gamelan in Houston, the Lehigh Valley Gamelan in Bethlehem, Pennsylvania, and Gamelan Tunas Mekar in Denver. Gamelan Sari Raras is an active Javanese ensemble in Berkeley, California; the name was given to the group by Widiyanto (aka Midiyanto), and the instruments, brought to the U.S. from Java in 1971, are named Kyai Udan Mas, or Venerable Golden Rain. The Indonesian Embassy in Washington, DC hosts another Javanese gamelan, as well as offering classes in Balinese gamelan and various styles of Indonesian dance.

Canadian composer Claude Vivier wrote several works for Balinese and Javanese gamelan after visiting the region in 1977 and 1978, including Aikea and Cinq chansons pour percussion (1980). Canada's oldest gamelan is the Toronto-based Evergreen Club Contemporary Gamelan (with Sundanese degung instruments), founded in 1983. The oldest Balinese style gamelan is Gamelan Giri Kedaton, in Montreal, founded in 1987 by composer José Evangelista and Balinese Composer and teacher I Wayan Suweca, the group began as an offshoot of the gamelan class at the Université de Montreal that began being taught that same year, eventually the group formalized its structure and became a separate independent entity from the university in 1995, eventually getting the status of "resident ensemble" at the faculty of music of the university.

The first Balinese gamelan instruments of Giri Kedaton (1 Gong Kebyar, 1 Balinese style Angklung and 1 Gambuh set and 1 Beleganjur set) where gifted by the Indonesian government to the Université de Montreal after the 1986 Vancouver World Fair, over the years the ensemble also added additional gamelan instrument including a gamelan selunding, Gender Wayang sets and a gamelan Gambang. In 2025 Giri Kedaton was recognized by the Indonesian government for its continued effort in sharing Balinese and indonesian culture in Canada.

Also part of the 1986 world fair donation was a Javanese set of instruments donated to Simon Fraser University, this set became the ensemble Kyai Madu Sari (Venerable Essence of Honey), and resides at the School for the Contemporary Arts at Simon Fraser University.

A gamelan gadhon, Alligator Joy, was commissioned from Pak Tentrem of Solo, Central Java and brought to Vancouver in 1990 and resides at the Western Front Artist Center. Both Vancouver-based ensembles are regularly used in performances by the Vancouver Community Gamelan. A 5 note Semar Pegulingan Balinese Gamelan, also known as Pelegongan, is housed at the Indonesian Embassy in Ottawa.

The instruments were commissioned by musician Eric Da Silva in 1996 in Bali to closely follow the tuning and instrumentation of the classic gamelan ensemble in Teges Kanginan and the ensemble founded in Ottawa in 2001. The Ottawa group, Semara Winangun, has met weekly since 2001.

== United Kingdom ==
There are over eighty gamelans (as of 2002) of various kinds in the United Kingdom, many of them based at colleges or community centres. University of York was the first British university to purchase a gamelan, named Kyai Sekar Patak; it is still played by students there. The oldest community Gamelan group in the UK is the Oxford Gamelan Society, which plays Kyai Madu Laras, donated to the University of Oxford's Bate Collection of Musical Instruments by the Indonesian ministry of Forestry in 1985. Other active groups exist at SOAS, Dartington College of Arts, Queen's University Belfast, the University of Aberdeen, the University of Durham, Kingston University and City University, London, amongst others. A program of classes has relaunched at Southbank Centre, which also has a performing group of gamelan professionals, the Southbank Gamelan Players. In Cambridge, the (Gamelan Duta Laras) plays both traditional music and new compositions, and gives yearly dance performances as well as running introductory workshops. The Glasgow-based Gamelan Naga Mas regularly gives performances and introductory workshops, teacher and special needs (Gamalanability) courses in Scotland. The London Symphony Orchestra holds a Balinese gamelan at LSO St Luke's; this is used by schools, a community group, players of the orchestra and Balinese composers.

== Ireland ==
There are several gamelans in the Republic of Ireland, both institutionally and privately owned.

The first gamelan in Ireland was acquired by the music department of University College Cork. The gamelan was custom-made for UCC by gong-smith Pak Tentrem Sarwanto in Java and arrived in Ireland in 1995. The UCC Javanese gamelan was given the name Nyai Sekar Madu Sari (Venerable Flower of Honey Essence) in a traditional naming ceremony.

Galway also boasts a gamelan. It is owned by Soundscape, a Brothers of Charity group. The gamelan is used both for in a music therapy and community outreach capacity and also by an amateur musicians group called Gamelan na Gaillimhe. The official opening ceremony of the gamelan, where it was welcomed to the city of Galway by both the local musicians group and members of London group Siswa Sukra, was held in the Town Hall Theatre on 1 October 2011.

The first regular gamelan orchestra in Ireland's capital city of Dublin was established in University College Dublin in October 2012, directed by Dr Peter Moran. This is a Solonese set of instruments, originally owned privately by Niamh Tiernan.

In April 2013, the National Concert Hall announced that Peter Moran was to establish a second gamelan orchestra in Dublin, with newly built instruments presented as a gift from Sultan Hamengkubuwono X of Yogyakarta, to be housed permanently in the National Concert Hall. As of 2018, there were four different ensembles regularly rehearsing and performing on these instruments.

== Russia ==
Gamelan Dadali is the first, and as of 2026, the only Javanese gamelan group in Moscow, Russia. It was established under the patronage of the Indonesian Embassy in Moscow in 2017. The name of the group was inspired by the Javanese word Dadali which means garuda. Garuda is the symbol of the Indonesian state. The name Gamelan Dadali reflects an Indonesian cultural symbol in Moscow.

The group has more than 50 songs in its repertoire including classic and modern compositions. Gamelan Dadali team also performs musical accompaniment to the Wayang Kulit shadow theater and classical Indonesian dance. The group performs during cultural festivals, it accompanies yoga events, as well as exhibitions and presentations.

In December 2021, the group presented the first-ever wayang performance in the Russian language with a Russian-speaking puppeteer.

== See also ==
- Gamelan
- Music of Indonesia
