= Tejano Music Award for Album of the Year – Norteño =

Annual US music award

- Current: 2016 Tejano Music Awards
- Awarded for: Norteño Album of the Year
- Country: United States
- Presented by: Local television and radio stations
- First award: 2004
- Currently held by: Siggno (2015)

Highlights
- Most awards: Siggno (2)
- Website: Tejano Music Awards

The Tejano Music Award for Album of the Year – Norteño (formerly the Tejano Music Award for Album of the Year – Conjunto Norteño) is an honor presented annually by the Texas Talent Musicians Association (TTMA). The award was established during the rise of norteño music in the early 2000s decade. Musicians who were performers of conjunto music were also nominated for the award when it was first given out at the 24th awards ceremony, and were no longer eligible to be nominated after the TMA brought back the Tejano Music Award for Album of the Year – Conjunto at the 27th awards ceremony.

Current holder, Siggno holds the record with most wins at two. Girl group Las Fenix, remains the only female musicians to have been nominated as of 2016.

== Recipients ==
Year	Performing artist(s)	Work	Nominees	Ref.
2004	Michael Salgado	Tu Musica Sin Fronteras		
2005–2012	Not awarded			
2013	Siggno	El Mundo Se Acabo	Michael Salgado – Buscando Amor; Solido – Mas Solido Mas Norteño	
2014	Solido	Inolvidable	Intocable – En Peligro de Extinción; Duelo – Libre Por Naturaleza; Servando Ramos y Los Nuevos Leones – Vamos Al 100	
2015	Siggno	Zodiacal	Retono – Deja Enseñarte; Las Fenix – Heliópolis; Grupo Vidal – Mis Dos Mamas; Michael Salgado – Nada Es Eterno	
