= Liang Tsai-Ping =

Chinese guzheng player

Liang Tsai-Ping (Chinese: 梁在平; pinyin: Liáng Zàipíng, born Gaoyang County (高阳县), Hebei, China, February 23, 1910 or 1911; died Taipei, Taiwan, June 28, 2000) was a master of the guzheng, a Chinese traditional zither. He is considered one of the 20th century's most important players and scholars of the instrument. He also played and taught the guqin (7-string zither).

== Early career ==
At age 14, Liang moved to Beijing, where he began his studies with Professors Ying-mei Shih (Shi Yingmei) and Tze-you Wei (Wei Ziyou). After printing his first work, Ni Cheng Pu (Ni Zheng Pu), a guzheng teaching manual in 1938, he brought his instruments and conferred with several masters and companies. He graduated from Beijing Jiaotong University, majoring in applied science.

He moved to Taiwan in 1949, where he lived for the rest of his life. He worked in the Ministry of Commerce while continuing his musical activities. Liang had much to do with the revival of the guzheng in the 20th century, helping to establish the instrument as one of the major Chinese traditional solo instruments, as well as a component of the Chinese orchestra. Throughout his life, he preferred the older steel string version of the instrument. For 25 years, he served as the president of the Chinese Classical Music Association, which was organized in Taipei in 1951.

In addition to performing on the guzheng, he researched the instrument's history and repertoire, studying the playing of elder guzheng masters from various parts of China, learning and comparing their styles.

He also created new works for the instrument. In 1951, following the release of his first composition, Longing for an Old Friend, he composed more than forty pieces for the guzheng. His book, Music of the Cheng, has been published in six editions.

== International tours ==
Liang performed widely throughout the world. He first performed in India while on his way to the United States. While at Yale University in 1945–46, he introduced a performance on the "China Program" with the American writer Emily Hahn, on DuMont Television. A colorful sound film called Melody of Ancient China was produced for him by the Harmon Foundation in 1946. Under the sponsorship of Pearl S. Buck, Liang gave solo performances in several major U.S. cities.

He traveled to Japan in 1952, where he was greeted by the renowned koto player Michio Miyagi, and also traveled to Seoul, Korea, performing at Sarabul Art College and The National Center for Korean Traditional Performing Arts.

Liang introduced the guzheng at the First Southeast Asia Music Conference in Manila, Philippines in 1955. He performed in ten European nations in 1958, participated in the International Music Symposium in Manila, and served as the Chief Delegate of the Republic of China in April 1966. Under the sponsorship of the Honolulu Academy of Arts, he performed and lectured on seven U.S. college campuses in May 1967.

For the Asia Society in New York, he directed the Shantung Music Ensemble in 50 recitals in the United States in the spring of 1972. Invited by the overseas Chinese Teachers Federation, Liang performed in Singapore and in four cities of Malaysia, Bangkok, and Hong Kong in 1973.

Invited by the Performing Arts Programs, Asia Society, Liang conducted a three-month recital (including Carnegie Hall) and lecture tour to Japan, Canada, and the United States in the spring of 1974.

== Students ==
Among Liang's students was the American composer Lou Harrison (1917-2003), who became the first American to become a proficient guzheng performer, and also a composer of idiomatic music for the instrument. In 1962, Harrison went on to form (with two other American musicians: his student Richard Dee, b. 1936, and William Colvig; along with the singer Lily Chin) an ensemble that toured the California playing traditional Chinese music, the first American group of its type.

== Personal life ==
On August 14, 1933, Liang Tsai-Ping married Jiang Xixian (蒋希娴) in Beijing. The two of them celebrated their 50th wedding anniversary at Renai Baptist Church (仁愛堂) in Taipei on August 14, 1983.

Liang's second son is the scholar and composer David Mingyue Liang (Chinese: Liang Mingyue, 梁铭越, b. 1941), and his daughter is the soprano Liang Mingshi (梁铭时).

== Books by Liang Tsai-Ping ==
- Liang, Tsai-Ping (1962). On Chinese Music. Taipei, Taiwan.
- Liang, Tsai-Ping, ed. (1970). Chinese Musical Instruments & Pictures. Taipei, Taiwan: Chinese Classical Music Association.
- Liang, Tsai-Ping (1971). Music of Cheng, Chinese 16-Stringed Zither. [Taipei, Taiwan]: Chinese Classical Music Association.

== Discography ==
- Liang, Tsai-Ping. Chinese Masterpieces for the Cheng. LP. Lyrichord.
- China's Instrumental Heritage. CD. Lyrichord Discs. Recorded c. 1960.
- Liang, Tsai-ping. The Chinese Cheng: Ancient and Modern. CD. Lyrichord Discs.

== See also ==
- Guzheng
