= American gamelan =

Style and scene of gamelan music

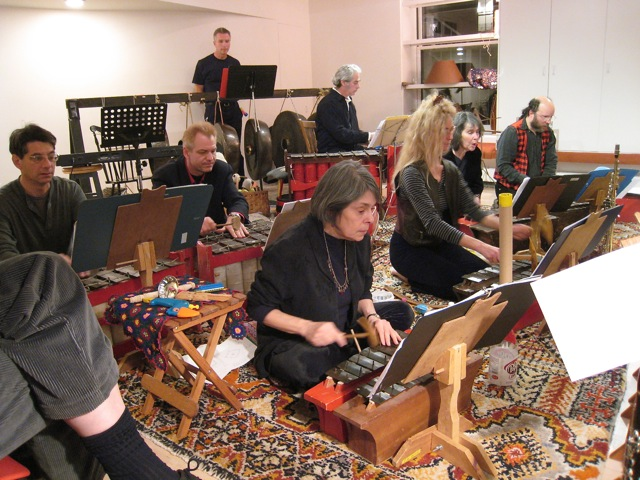
Gamelan Son of Lion, a Javanese-style iron American gamelan based in New York City that is devoted to new music, playing in a loft in Soho, Manhattan in 2007

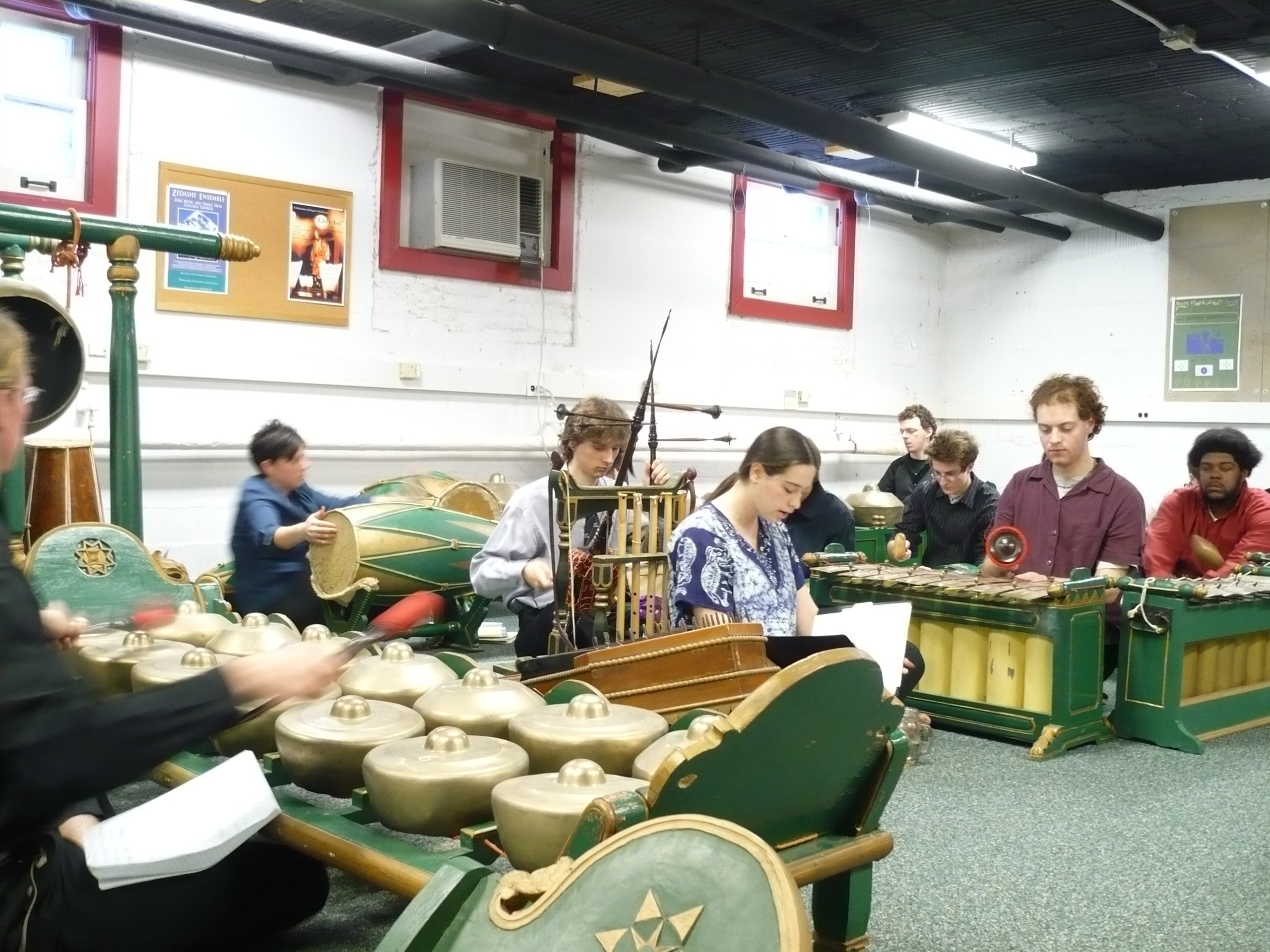
Kyai Barleyan, a Javanese gamelan at Oberlin College in Ohio. Acquired in 1970, it is believed to be the third-oldest gamelan in use in the United States.

American gamelan could refer to both instruments and music; the term has been used to refer to gamelan-style instruments built by Americans, as well as to music written by American composers to be played on gamelan instruments. American gamelan music usually has some relationship to the gamelan traditions of Indonesia, as found primarily on the islands of Java and Bali in a variety of styles. Many American compositions can be played on Indonesian or American-made instruments. Indonesian gamelan can be made of a variety of materials, including bronze, iron, or bamboo. American gamelan builders used all sorts of materials including aluminum, tin cans, car hubcaps, steel, antique milk-strainers, etc. American gamelan may also describe the original music of American ensembles working with traditional instruments.

Dennis Murphy is often credited as being the first American to build instruments modeled on those of the Javanese gamelan, circa 1960. This work led to his doctoral thesis at Wesleyan University, entitled "The Autochthonous American Gamelan". Murphy started a gamelan group with his instruments at Goddard College in Vermont in 1967; that group later became the community-based Plainfield Village Gamelan.

There have been other American builders of gamelan as well, on both the East and West coasts. Following Murphy's model was Barbara Benary, who built the instruments still used today for Gamelan Son of Lion. On the West coast, the airline industry made aluminum affordable, and this became the material of choice for several gamelan builders. Daniel Schmidt, a composer-builder, built an ensemble called "The Berkeley Gamelan" (independent of the University of California, Berkeley) as well as the set of instruments that would develop into Gamelan Pacifica in Seattle. Paul Dresher also used aluminum.

== Harrison and Colvig ==
Harrison worked with John Cage in the 40s on percussion compositions with found metal objects, resulting in alternate scaled music. Lou Harrison and William Colvig, who met in 1967 in San Francisco, built a set of tuned percussion instruments that they called "an American gamelan" in order to differentiate it from Indonesian ensembles. It was first used in Harrison's work La Koro Sutro in 1972. These are now referred to as "Old Granddad", and Harrison wrote some pieces that can only be played on this set, including La Koro Sutro. Lou Harrison spent some time with a Javanese gamelan in 1976 (when Kyai Udan Mas, now at the University of California, Berkeley, was in residence at San Jose State University). This inspired him and his partner William Colvig to build a gamelan modelled specifically on Udan Mas (in instrumentation, although not in tuning). For this he used aluminum primarily, although the "great gong" was eventually fashioned out of iron.

Colvig and Harrison built two large "double" gamelan (meaning that there were instruments in both the pelog and slendro tunings). The first was Si Betty, named for the financial benefactor Betty Freeman. Si Betty was bequeathed to Jody Diamond, and was in residence at Harvard University from 2007 to 2017; in 2018, Si Betty moved to Bucknell University in Lewisburg, PA. The second was named "Si Darius/Si Madeleine" after Darius Milhaud and his wife, because it was while holding the Milhaud chair at Mills College (where the gamelan still resides) that Harrison and Colvig had the support for its construction; a group there (as of 2008) is directed by Daniel Schmidt. Lou Harrison was well known for his compositions for gamelan; he was particularly adept at combining western instruments with his Javanese-style gamelan ensemble. (The scores for all of his gamelan works are published by the American Gamelan Institute).

== See also ==
- Gamelan outside Indonesia
- List of gamelan ensembles in the United States
