= West Coast School =

American school of composition

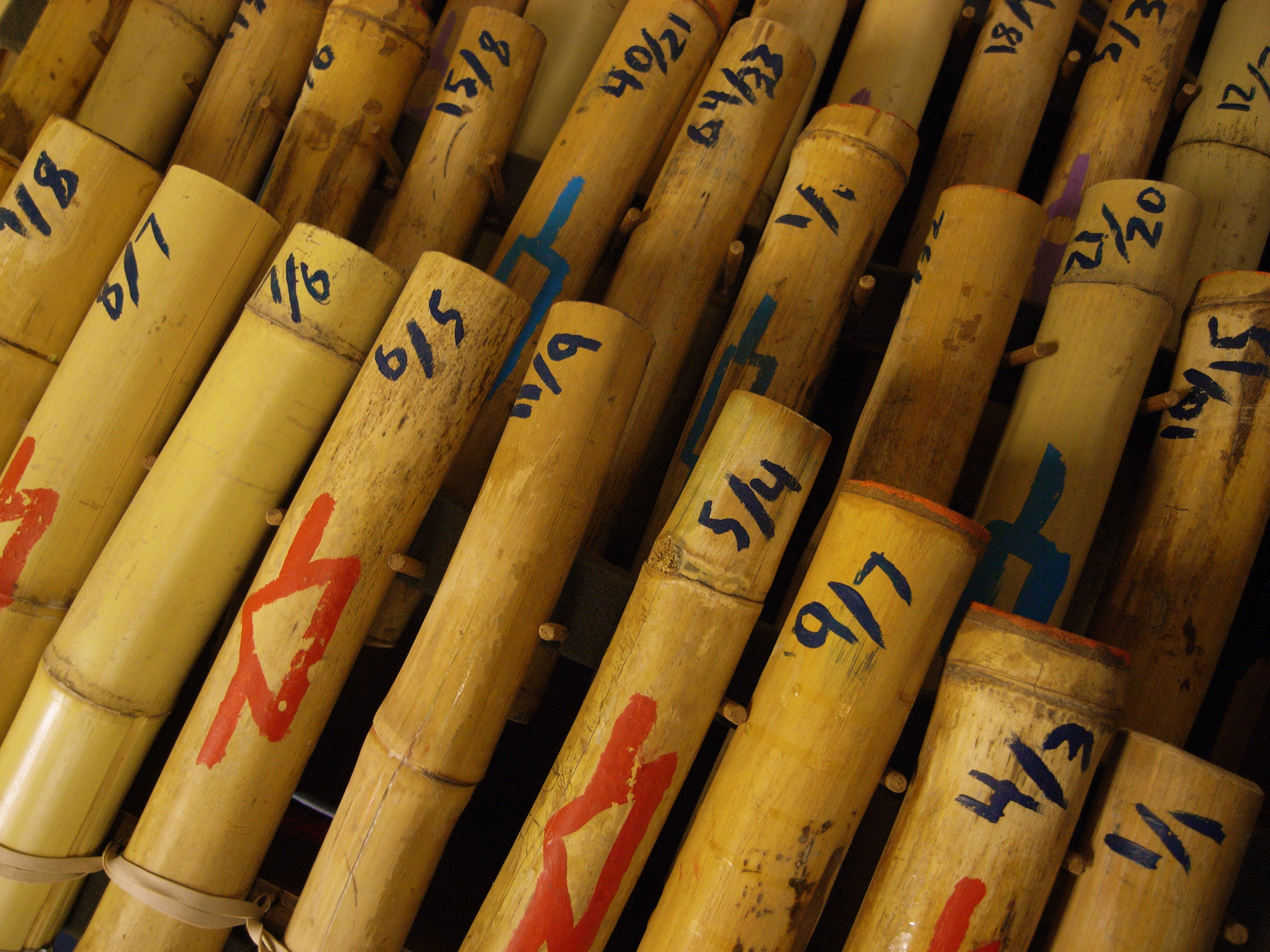
Percussion instrument invented by Harry Partch with just pitch ratios marked.

The West Coast School are composers and compositional style(s) associated with the West Coast of the United States, specifically California. Henry Cowell is considered, "the father of West Coast experimentalism," and the influence of traditional Asian and other world musics may be traced back to Cowell. Rather than Orient/Occident, composer Lou Harrison argues for a Pacific/Atlantic conception, where the West Coast is necessarily part of the Pacific, and thus associated with Asia more than Europe. Other influences and interests include the use of tonality, just intonation, and dance.

Techniques employed by composers of the West Coast School include found and percussion instruments, such as the Indonesian gamelan. Harrison cites, "new instruments and new tunings."

Composers considered to be part of the West Coast School include Henry Cowell, John Cage, Lou Harrison, and Harry Partch. Those four composers were each ultramodernist, Californian (rather than from the East Coast/New York), and LGBT; all of which would have contributed to marginalization.
