= Jody Diamond =

American classical composer

- Jody Diamond in 2008
- Born: Jody Diamond; April 23, 1953 (age 73); Pasadena, California
- Education: University of California, Berkeley (B.A. Music, Communication, and Culture); San Francisco State University (M.A. Interdisciplinary Studies in Music and Education)
- Occupations: Composer, performer, writer
- Known for: Founder, American Gamelan Institute (1981). Artist in Residence of Harvard University 2007–2017.

Jody Diamond (born Pasadena, California, April 23, 1953) is an American composer, performer, writer, publisher, editor, and educator. She specializes in traditional and new music for Indonesian gamelan and is active internationally as a scholar, performer, and publisher.

== Biography ==
She received a B.A. from the University of California, Berkeley in 1977, and an M.A. from San Francisco State University in 1979, pursuing interdisciplinary studies in music, anthropology, and education.

Diamond founded (in 1981) and directs the American Gamelan Institute and edits its journal, Balungan. She is also a co-founder and co-director, with Larry Polansky, of Frog Peak Music (a composers' collective).

She received a Fulbright Senior Scholar Regional Research Fellowship to survey contemporary music in Indonesia (1988–89), as well as two National Endowment for the Humanities Fellowships for work on Indonesian composers (1991), and for work on the gamelan music of Lou Harrison (2007).

She has created numerous works for gamelan, some based on songs from various traditions. Her works have been performed internationally. She is often a guest composer/performer with Gamelan Son of Lion, notably for their participation in the Yogyakarta Gamelan Festival in 1996. She performed her own work in 1997 with Sapto Raharjo and Ben Pasaribu, and wrote an article for the Leonardo Music Journal with an epilogue by Sutanto on the "Yogyakarta Gamelan Festival 1997." A CD of her compositions for Javanese gamelan, "In That Bright World" on New World Records, was recorded by musicians of ISI Surakarta in 2001.

Diamond was an Artist in Residence in the Music Department of Harvard University (2007–2017), using the instruments of Gamelan Si Betty, built by Lou Harrison and William Colvig, for collaborative projects and an open performance group Gamelan SiBetty and the Viewpoint Composers' Gamelan. At Dartmouth College in Hanover NH, she was a Senior Lecturer in AMES (Asian and Middle Eastern Studies) and Indonesian Gamelan Ensemble Director, (1990– 2016) with Lipur Sih ("Comforting Your Loved Ones") a Javanese gadon built by Tentrem Sarwanto of Surakarta in Central Java, as well as the Balinese Gamelan Angklung Sleeping Fox. She has also taught at the University of California, Berkeley, Mills College, Goddard College, Bates College, Franklin Pierce College, and Monash University in Australia. In 2017, Diamond was an Affiliated Artist at MIT, where she collaborated with Evan Ziporyn on concerts for Lou Harrison's centennial year.

Diamond was the gamelan teacher and arranger for the American composer Lou Harrison from 1976 until his death in 2003. His largest Javanese-style gamelan, Gamelan Si Betty, was bequeathed to Diamond by Harrison and his partner William Colvig. She is also the owner of the Harrison/Colvig ensemble Old Granddad #4, the fourth set of instruments called the American Gamelan.

== Personal life ==
Diamond is of Jewish heritage, and was married to the composer Larry Polansky.

== Selected works ==
- 1981 In that Bright World, voice, gamelan (based on Appalachian folk song)
- 1982 Sabbath Bride, gamelan, 1982 (based on Hebrew melody)
- 1984 Hard Times, chorus, violin, mandocello, gamelan (based on a Stephen Foster song)
- 1990 Kenong, for Javanese kenong and 5–10 players. This piece has also been adapted for other instruments, including Bonang, and the Alto Bells (2018) of the Harrison/Colvig American gamelan Old Granddad#4.

== Writings ==
- "Out of Indonesia: Global Gamelan," Ethnomusicology Vol. 42, No. 1, Winter 1998, pp. 174–183. Reviews of a large number of recording by gamelan groups outside of Indonesia.
- "Interaction: New Music for Gamelan." Notes to accompany CD of same title, in Leonardo Music Journal, V. 2, 1992.
- "There Is No They There." Musicworks, no. 47, 1990, pp. 12–23.
- "'In the Beginning Was the Melody': the gamelan music of Lou Harrison." in A Lou Harrison Reader, Santa Fe:Soundings Press, 1987, pp. 100–103.
- "Modes of Consciousness and the Learning Process: an Alternative Model for Music Education." M.A. Thesis, San Francisco State, 1979

== Recordings ==
- In That Bright World: Music for Javanese Gamelan. Compositions by Diamond performed by the musicians of the Indonesian National Arts Institute in Surakarta, Central Java, called ISI Solo. Liner notes by Judith Becker can be downloaded at "In That Bright World". Produced by New World Records.
