= Cinq chansons pour percussion =

1980 composition by Claude Vivier

Cinq chansons pour percussion (English: Five Songs for Percussion) is a 1980 work for solo percussionist by Canadian composer Claude Vivier. It is an example of an extended American gamelan, featuring a very large array of percussion instruments that include gongs and bells from Chinese, Japanese, Indonesian and Thai origin.

== History ==
Canadian percussionist David Kent suggested Vivier to write a new work for him to perform, after returning from Indonesia with an assortment of gongs and other metallophones. Vivier was more than happy to begin writing, in spite of there being no paid commission from Kent. He would premiere the Cinq chansons in June 1982 in Toronto. Kent would later write an arrangement of Cinq chansons for between 2-3 percussionists.

Vivier was not in attendance to hear the piece's premiere, and would never hear it (along with the majority of his other works) during his lifetime. Kent would remark, "Perhaps it is one of the many paradoxes in his life, that a piece he considered to be one of his most personal works was to be shared by everyone except himself."

=== Composition ===
The five songs are as follows: Chanson du matin, Chanson à midi, Chanson au soleil, Chanson à la mort and Chanson d'adieu.

=== Program notes ===
The notes given by Vivier in the finished manuscript, with English translation below:

Cinq chansons pour percussion signifie littéralement ce que suggère le titre. Le mot « chanson » est pris dans son sens asiatique: cinq énoncés musicaux composés assez librement autour de quelques notes.

Cinq chansons pour percussion literally means just what the title suggests. The term "chansons" is used in the Asian sense and describes five musical statements based on a few notes each.

== Instrumentation ==
Percussion
16 bonang gongs
9 Thai nipple gongs
2 dobachi
1 daikin
1 medium tam-tam
