= List of music organizations in the United States =

This is a list of music organizations in the United States. It does not include symphony orchestras or other performance groups, or educational and research institutions unless they have significant programs outside the fields of education, research or performance. It does include corporations or record labels.

Generally, only currently extant organizations are included. Some historically significant but defunct groups may also be included.

International organizations are only included if they do have an American affiliate, and do have a major focus on American music.

Organization	Foundation	Purpose	Programs	Notes
Recording Industry Association of America (RIAA)	1952	"to foster a business and legal climate that supports and promotes our members' creative and financial vitality"	Lobbying and policy review, protects intellectual property interests of member corporations, protects First Amendment rights of artists, conducts research, sales certification, originally formed to administer the RIAA equalization	
National Music Publishers' Association	1917	"to protect, promote, and advance the interests of music’s creators."	NMPA protects its members’ property rights on the legislative, litigation, and regulatory fronts. In this vein, the NMPA continues to represent its members in negotiations to shape the future of the music industry by fostering a business environment that furthers both creative and financial success.	
Drum Corps International (DCI)	1972	"Drum Corps International is a cooperative association of its member and participating organizations: We seek to promote and inspire unparalleled excellence in music and performing arts throughout the world."	Drum Corps International World Championships	
National Academy of Music	2008	to promote, support and advance the art and science of music	‘Music Proficiency Examinations’ and ‘International Music Prizes’	The National Academy of Music has four categories of membership available: chartered membership, professional membership, student membership and honorary membership.
The Recording Academy	1957	to honor achievements "in the recording arts and supporting the music community."	Grammy Awards, Latin Grammy Awards, advocacy and education	"the only peer-presented award to honor artistic achievement, technical proficiency and overall excellence in the recording industry, without regard to album sales or chart position"
Americana Music Association (AMA)	1999	"to provide a forum for the advocacy of Americana music and to promote public awareness of the genre to support the creative and economic viability of professionals in this field."	Americana Music Honors & Awards, manage the Americana Radio Chart, advocacy, education, market research	
Nosotros	1970	"to enhance the artistic careers of Latino entertainers", "to improve the image of Latinos in the entertainment industry, promote employment in front of and behind the camera, and to provide educational opportunities for Hispanics in the Performing Arts"	Golden Eagle Awards	
National Endowment for the Arts	1965	"to supporting excellence in the arts, both new and established; bringing the arts to all Americans; and providing leadership in arts education"	Various educational and outreach programs, as well as grants	Independent arm of the federal government, claims to be the single "largest annual funder of the arts" in the country
Texas Talent Musicians Association (TTMA)	1980	"to promote professional excellence; a better understanding and greater appreciation for Tejano music; and to provide a public forum for songwriters, performers and musicians in order to recognize their artistic efforts and achievements through the annual Tejano Music Awards and related events"	Tejano Music Awards	
North American Basque Organizations	1973	"to promote and preserve cultural and social activities of the Basque people; to cultivate understanding and friendship between Basques themselves and between Basques and non-Basques; to educate and enlighten the public about Basque themes; and to advance open communications between Basques in the United States and Basques around the world"	Udaleku (music summer camp), Kantari Eguna	35 member clubs in US and 1 in Vancouver
Council for the Development of French in Louisiana		to "do any and all things necessary to accomplish the development, utilization, and preservation of the French language as found in Louisiana for the cultural, economic and touristic benefit of the state"		
Coalition for African Americans in the Performing Arts - CAAPA	2003	CAAPA supports Black classical musicians, youth and others in the performing arts by "Bringing Color to the Classics!"	The CAAPA Cause is a five-point initiative based on the CAAPA acronym including: Community Outreach, Arts Education, Audience Development, Performance Opportunities, and Arts Partnerships.	
Norwegian Singers Association of America			Singing conventions	
Pacific Coast Norwegian Singers Association	1902			
Hardanger Fiddle Association of America (Spelemanns Laget of Amerika, Spelemans Forbundet af Amerika)	1914-1952, reformed 1983	"preserving and cultivating interest in the hardingfele as well as regional Norwegian folk dances"	kappleikar (fiddling competitions)	formerly the Hardanger Violinist Association of America
Union of Scandinavian Singers	1886			Formed out of a union of five Swedish-American music groups
American Union of Swedish Singers	1892			
Knights and Ladies of Kaleva		"preserving Finnish identity in America"		
Estonian Singing Society (Eestlaste Laulu Selts)	1904			
Estonian American Music Club				
International Polka Association	1968	"promoting Polish American music while also providing leadership" to international polka		International organization, but primarily American in focus
Slovak American Home	1930	"to provide space for the social activities of various Slovak groups"		
Wisconsin Slovak Historical Society		"to sponsor... parties and picnics"		
Federated Slovak Societies			Slovak Days	
Ukrainian Music Institute	1952			Consists of 14 branches
Association of Ukrainian Choirs	1959			
Duquesne University Tamburitzans	1937	performance group that has been "extraordinarily influential" in Croatian American music, and has had a "crucial role in the formation of many 'junior tamburitza' societies"		
Tamburitza Association of America			Tamburitza Extravaganza	
Center for World Music				
American Society for Eastern Arts (ASEA)				Founded by Robert E. Brown, Sam and Louise Scripps
International Association of Independent Recording Artists (IAIRA)	2006	Serve as a trustworthy, unbiased repository for historical information, while providing a forum for industry leadership dialogue toward its goals.	The IAIRA Industry ICON Awards, IAIRA Certification	
American Gamelan Institute	1981		Maintains an archive of recordings, scores and monographs, publishes the gamelan journal Balungan	
Arts Indonesia				
BIBAK				
50/50innertainment				
Arab Community Center for Economic and Social Services (ACCESS)		to provide "alternatives in music promotion, production and education"	Sponsors concerts and festivals, a radio station in Dearborn, Michigan, summer music workshop, and Arab music classes	
Pacific Islander Council			Pacific Islander Festival	
Phi Mu Alpha Sinfonia (PMA)	1898		Central to being a Sinfonian is the belief that the manly musician is one who loves music, not for the sake of music itself, but as a means to elevating others. Through the Ossian Everett Mills Music Mission (MMM), dedicated Sinfonians exemplify this principle as acts of musical service. In keeping with Mills’ deep interest in the social and moral welfare of students, the MMM also instills a sense of social responsibility and charity in the Fraternity’s members. Each year, Sinfonians touch the lives of thousands through the MMM.	
International Distribution Rights of Administration (INDR Music Association); an Super Rights Music Collective	2022; restructured in 2024		The INDR Music Association is an international organization that functions as a music rights management and advocacy body. It was established to support artists, producers, and rights holders by providing services in distribution, publishing administration, performance rights organization (PRO) representation, and collective management.	Erik Zambrano is the current president of INDR (2024- 2027) term; Term has been altered by the Arbitration Panel Ruling
