= Daniel Goode =

American classical composer

Daniel Goode (born January 24, 1936) is an American composer and clarinetist.

Daniel Goode was born in New York City. After graduating in 1957 from Oberlin College, he studied composition at Columbia University with Henry Cowell and Otto Luening, receiving an MA 1962. He pursued further studies at the University of San Diego with Pauline Oliveros and Kenneth Gaburo (Benary and Sandow 2001).

Goode's works show influence from several sources, including bird song, Cape Breton fiddling, drone, Indonesian gamelan music, and minimal music (specifically music as a gradual process). Often two or more of these elements are combined in a single composition.

Goode created and served as Director of the Electronic Music Studio of Livingston College, Rutgers University from 1971 to 1998 and is co-director of the DownTown Ensemble which he co-founded in New York in 1983 (Benary and Sandow 2001). As a clarinetist he is proficient in the technique of circular breathing, which he uses frequently in performances with the group.

Since 1976, Goode has been a member of Gamelan Son of Lion, a Javanese-style iron gamelan ensemble dedicated to new music, for which he has composed many works. He has developed a special keyless clarinet made from a length of plastic pipe that allows him to play in the Indonesian slendro tuning system, which he plays with the group on occasion.

His works are published by Frog Peak Music and Theodore Presser.
