= Daniel Schmidt (musician) =

American composer and builder (born 1942)

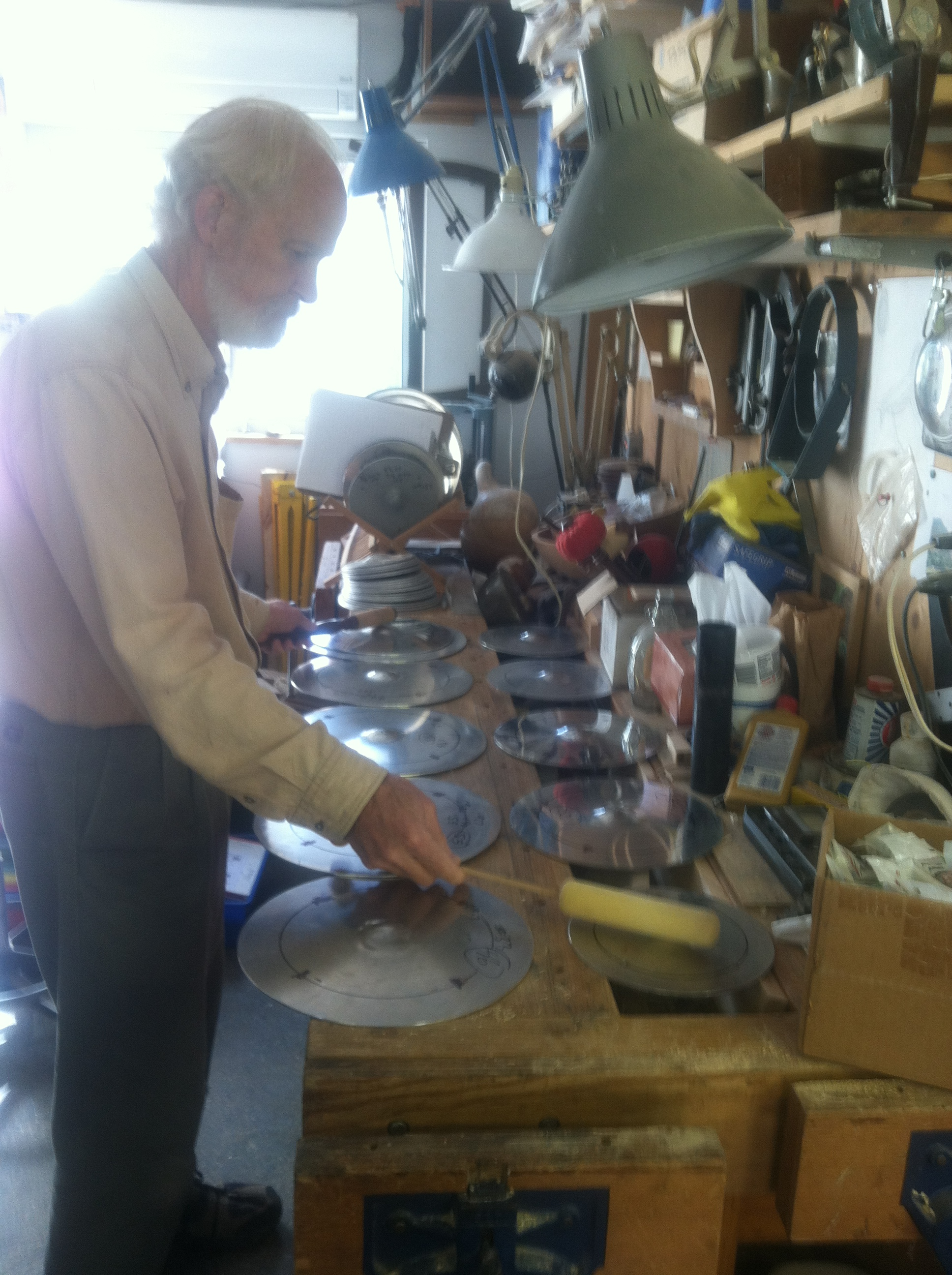
- Schmidt in 2013

Background information
- Born: 1942 (age 82–83)
- Genres: Contemporary classical music, American gamelan
- Occupation(s): Composer, instrument builder, teacher

Daniel Schmidt is an American composer and builder of American gamelan. He currently teaches gamelan and instrument building at Mills College. He is also a long-time collaborator with composer Paul Dresher.

Schmidt earned a BA in music from Westminster Choir College and an MFA in composition and Javanese music from California Institute of the Arts. He met gamelan composer Lou Harrison in 1975 at the Center for World Music in Berkeley. Together they organized a concert of original compositions for gamelan. Schmidt participated in frequent discussions with Harrison and others that helped inspire his work in both construction of gamelan instruments and composing for them.

Schmidt has built many aluminum and brass gamelan sets including the Berkeley Gamelan, the Sonoma State Gamelan, and Mills College Gamelan.

In addition to gamelan instruments, Schmidt has collaborated with Paul Dresher in inventing and building the instruments for several traveling performances, including "Sound Stage" and "Schick Machine," as well as an interactive exhibit called "Sound Maze."

Schmidt is a gamelan composer in addition to his instrument building work. He says of these two parallel activities, "Instrument building and composing are hand-in-glove activities. I build instruments to meet the demands of the music I write. I operate with a vision which includes both. I dream of a timbre and at the same time I am imagining its musical setting. These two sides of my life are melded together in infinite ways."

An LP album of In My Arms, Many Flowers was released in the spring of 2016 on the Recital label.
