= Gamelan Son of Lion =

American musical ensemble

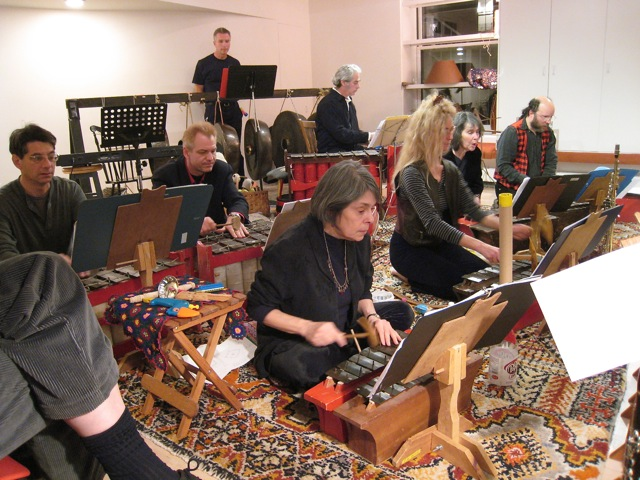
Gamelan Son of Lion performing in 2007

Gamelan Son of Lion (GSOL) is an American gamelan ensemble based in New York City. The group was founded in 1976 by Barbara Benary (who constructed most of the instruments), Philip Corner, and Daniel Goode. It is a composers' collective as well as repertory ensemble. Current composers in the group, in addition to the co-founders, are: David Demnitz, Laura Liben, Jody Kruskal, Lisa Karrer, Marnen Laibow-Koser, Jody Diamond, and David Simons.

Gamelan Son of Lion's keyed instruments have bars constructed of iron, in the Javanese style. The group uses both the pelog and slendro tuning systems, sometimes in conjunction with one another within a single composition.

== Discography ==
- 1979 – Gamelan In The New World (Folkways)
- 1992 – Macedonian Air Drumming (Bridge) – includes 1 track performed by GSOL
- 1992 – Interaction: New Music for Gamelan (Leonardo/ISAST) – includes 2 tracks performed by GSOL
- 1995 – New Gamelan/New York (GSOL Records)
- 1996 – Gamelan as a Second Language (GSOL)
- 2002 – Bending the Gending (GSOL)
- 2004 – The Complete Gamelan in the New World (Locust Music)
- 2004 – Prismatic Hearing (Tzadik)
- 2005 – Metal Notes (Locust Music)
- 2006 – Sun on Snow (New World)
- 2007 – Dragon Toes (GSOL)
- 2008 – Sonogram (Innova)
- 2009 – Fung Sha Noon (Tzadik)
