= Barbara Benary =

American musician (1946–2019)

Barbara Benary (April 7, 1946 – March 17, 2019) was an American composer and ethnomusicologist specializing in Indonesian and Indian music.

Benary composed music for a number of theatrical productions at La MaMa Experimental Theatre Club during the 1970s. She composed music for the ETC Company of La MaMa's repertory production of The Only Jealousy of Emer, which was produced during the early 1970s at La MaMa's East Village theater and on tour. She composed music for Gauntlet or the Moon's on Fire, written and directed by John Braswell and produced at La MaMa in 1976.

In 1976, she co-founded Gamelan Son of Lion with Philip Corner and Daniel Goode. She constructed most of the group's instruments. Benary performed with Gamelan Son of Lion in a production called 1001 Instruments You've Never Seen or Heard at La MaMa in 1979. Her major works include two shadow puppet operas entitled Karna and The Story of Esther.

== Personal life ==
Barbara Benary was born in 1946 in Bay Shore, NY. Daughter of Harold and Blanche Benary. She received a B.A. from Sarah Lawrence College in Bronxville, NY and an M.A. and Ph.D. from Wesleyan University in Middletown, CT where her areas of specialization were musics of India and Indonesia. She married woodwind player and instrument designer Steven Silverstein in 1977. She died in 2019, aged 72, from Parkinson's disease and is survived by her husband Steve and daughter Lyra Samara Silverstein.
