= William Colvig =

American musician

William (Bill) Colvig (March 13, 1917 – March 1, 2000) was an electrician and amateur musician who was the partner for 33 years of composer Lou Harrison, whom he met in San Francisco in 1967. Colvig helped construct the American gamelan used in works such as the puppet opera Young Caeser [sic] (1971), La Koro Sutro (1972), and the Suite for Violin and American Gamelan (1974).

== Films ==
- 1986 – Lou Harrison: "cherish, conserve, consider, create." Directed by Eric Marin.
- 1995 – Musical Outsiders: An American Legacy – Harry Partch, Lou Harrison, and Terry Riley. Directed by Michael Blackwood.

== Personal life ==
Colvig lived for many years with Lou Harrison in Aptos, California. He and Harrison purchased land in Joshua Tree, California, where they designed and built the Harrison House Retreat, a straw bale house.

== See also ==
- Ingolf Dahl
- West Coast School

== Sources ==
- Brett Campbell, "Hail Caesar! Harrison Opera's Epic Quest", accessed July 7, 2010
- Maria Cizmic, "Composing the Pacific", accessed July 7, 2010
- Patrick Gardner, "Lou Harrison: La Koro Sutro", Providence Singers, accessed July 7, 2010
- Anthony Linick, The Lives of Ingolf Dahl (Bloomington, IN: AuthorHouse, 2008)
