= Lou Harrison =

American composer (1917–2003)

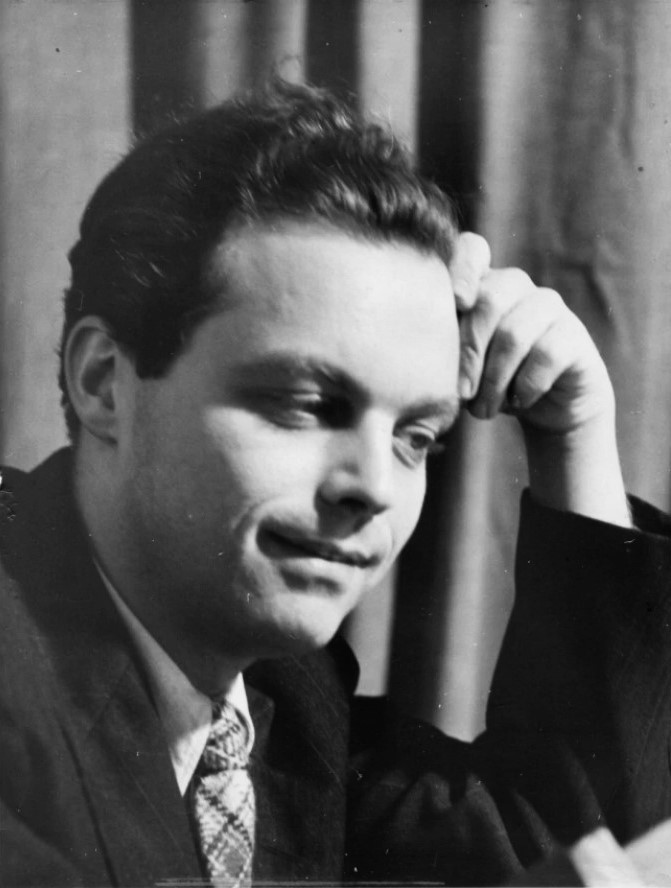
- Portrait of a young Harrison at the piano, c. early 1940s
- Born: May 14, 1917; Portland, Oregon, U.S.
- Died: February 2, 2003 (aged 85); Lafayette, Indiana, U.S.
- Occupations: Composer; music critic; music theorist; painter
- Partners: William Colvig (1967–2000); Todd Burlingame (2001–2003)

Signature
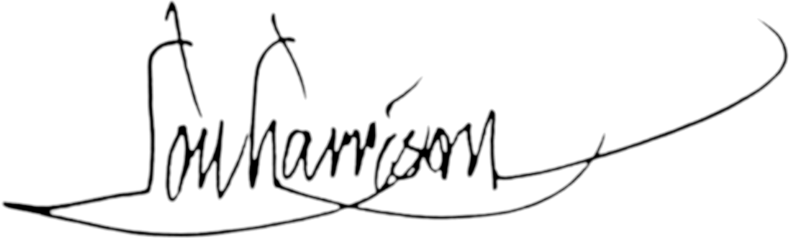

Lou Silver Harrison (May 14, 1917 – February 2, 2003) was an American composer, music critic, music theorist, painter, and creator of unique musical instruments. Harrison initially wrote in a dissonant, ultramodernist style similar to his former teacher and contemporary, Henry Cowell, but later moved toward incorporating elements of non-Western cultures into his work. Notable examples include a number of pieces written for Javanese style gamelan instruments, inspired after his introduction to noted gamelan musician Kanjeng Notoprojo. Harrison would create his own musical ensembles and instruments with his partner, William Colvig, who are now both considered founders of the American gamelan movement and world music; along with composers Harry Partch and Claude Vivier, and ethnomusicologist Colin McPhee.

The majority of Harrison's works and custom instruments are written for just intonation rather than the more widespread equal temperament, making him one of the most prominent composers to have experimented with microtones. He was also one of the first composers to have written in the international language Esperanto, and among the first to incorporate strong themes of homosexuality in his music.

== Early life and career ==
=== Childhood ===
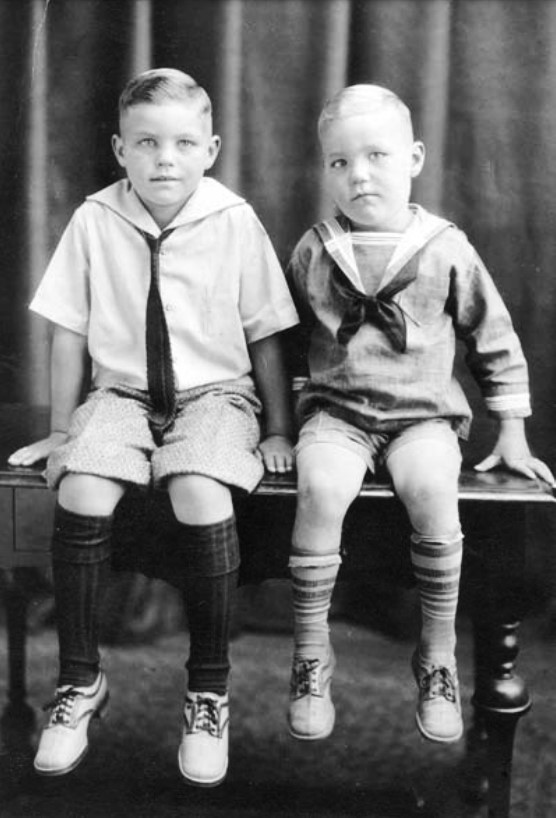
Lou (left) and Bill Harrison (right), c. early 1920s

Harrison was born on May 14, 1917, in Portland, Oregon, to parents Clarence "Pop" Harrison and former Alaska resident Calline Lillian "Cal" Harrison (née Silver). The family was initially well-off financially from past inheritances, but fell on hard times leading up to the Great Depression. Harrison lived in the Portland area for only nine years before moving with his parents and younger brother, Bill, to a number of locations in Northern California, including Sacramento, Stockton, and finally San Francisco. With the city having a large population of Asian Americans at the time, Harrison was often surrounded by the influence of the East. His mother decorated their home with Japanese lanterns, ornate Persian rugs, and replicas of ancient Chinese artifacts. The diverse array of music he was exposed to there, including Cantonese opera, Hawai'ian kīkākila, jazz, norteño and classical music, deeply fascinated and interested him. He would later say he had heard far more traditional Chinese music than European music by the time he was an adult.

Harrison's early interest in music was supported by his parents, with Cal paying for occasional piano lessons and Pop driving the young Harrison to study traditional Gregorian chant at the Mission San Francisco de Asís for a short period. The family's frequent moves in search of work, however, provided the adolescent Harrison little opportunity to develop any long-term friendships. Often feeling like an outsider, he relied on his own judgment to guide his aesthetic decisions and decidedly drifted further and further away from the artistic style of the West. He instead retreated into furthering his own personal education, often spending time at the local library to read books on everything ranging from zoology to Confucianism. He recalled being able to read two books a day, and the extremely wide diaspora of interests prompted him to connect disparate influences throughout his life, including in his future compositions. It's believed the loneliness of his youth contributed to his strong dislike of urban metropolises and so-called "city life".

Harrison discovered he was gay while attending Burlingame High School and realizing his attraction toward a male classmate. By the time he graduated in December 1934 at the age of 17, he had come out to his family, and decided thereafter to make no attempt at hiding his sexual preference and personality – nearly unheard of for gay men of the time.

=== First musical education ===
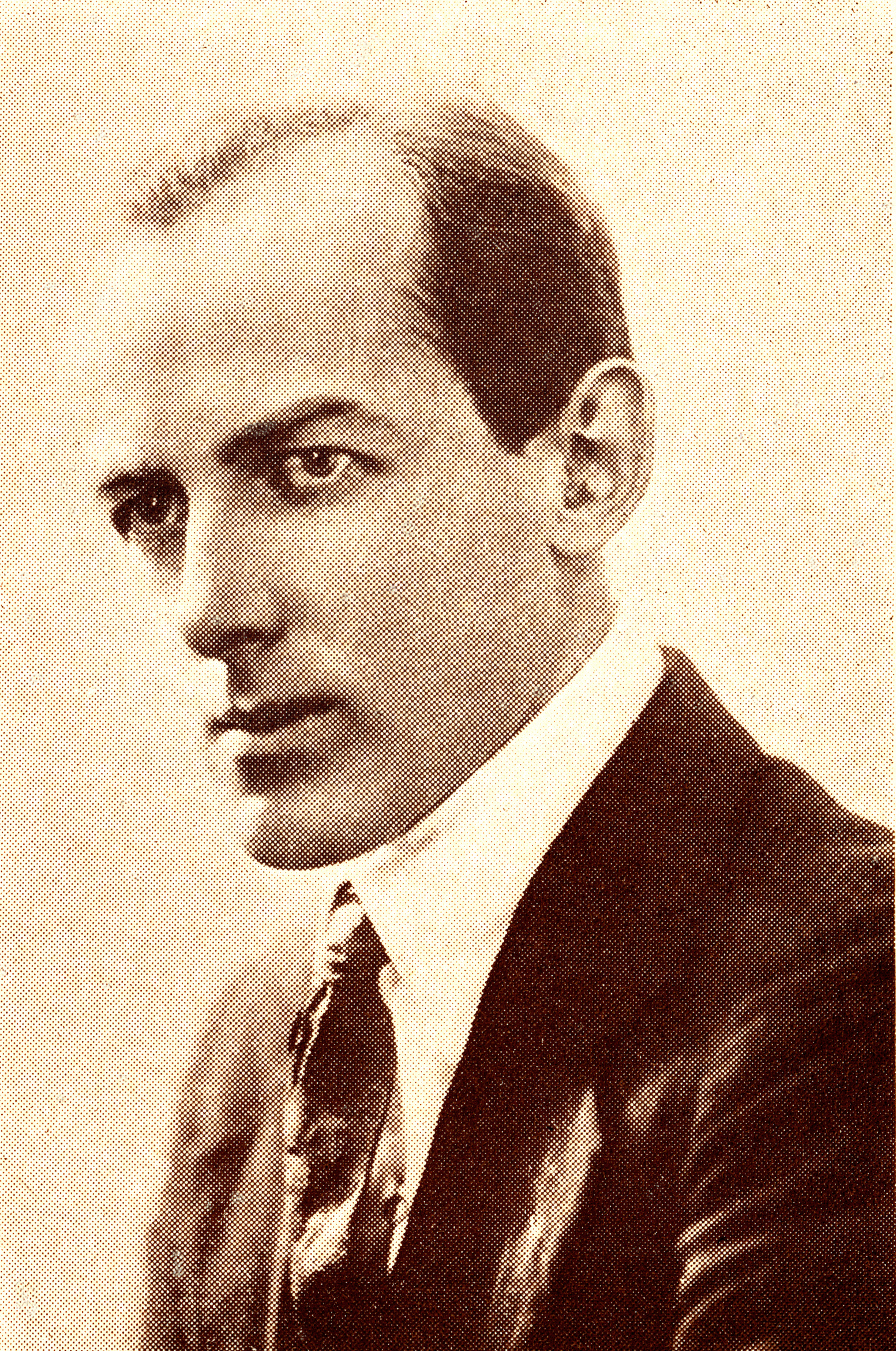
Harrison considered Henry Cowell (pictured) his greatest musical inspiration and one of his closest friends

After graduating high school in 1934, Harrison enrolled in San Francisco State College (now San Francisco State University). It was there where he took Henry Cowell's "Music of the Peoples of the World" course being offered by the UC Berkeley Extension. Harrison quickly became one of Cowell's most enthusiastic students, and he subsequently appointed him as class assistant. After attending a Palo Alto performance of one of Cowell's pieces for piano and improvised percussion in June 1935, Harrison would proclaim it to be one of the most extraordinary works he had ever heard. He would later incorporate similar elements of found percussion and aleatoric performance in his music. In fall of the same year, Harrison approached Cowell for private composition lessons, initiating a personal and professional friendship that continued until Cowell's death from cancer in 1965. He was the first to publish Harrison's music, through the publishing house he founded, New Music Edition. During Cowell's four-year stay in San Quentin Prison on a morals charge involving homosexual acts, Harrison publicly appealed for his release, and regularly visited him for composition lessons through the prison's bars.

While still studying at age 19, he became an interim professor of music at Mills College in Oakland from 1936 to 1939. In 1941, he transferred to the University of California, Los Angeles to work in the dance department; teaching students Laban movement analysis and playing piano accompaniment. While there, he took theory lessons from Arnold Schoenberg, leading him to further his interest in twelve-tone technique. He would later say, "... it was no jump at all to learn to write twelve-tone music; Henry's the one who taught me." The pieces he was writing at this time, however, were largely percussive works using unconventional materials, such as discarded car brake drums and garbage cans, as musical instruments. Few of his surviving pieces – including one of the earliest known examples, Prelude for Grandpiano (1937) – follow the serialist twelve-tone idiom. He began using tone clusters in his piano works, à la Cowell, but differed from his technique by calling for an "octave bar" – a flat wooden bar approximately an octave long, with a slightly concave rubber bottom. This allowed the clusters to be much louder than they otherwise would be, and gave the piano more of an unpitched, gong-like sound. His experimental and free-wheeling style flourished during this period, with pieces like the Concerto for Violin and Percussion Orchestra (1940) and Labyrinth (1941). This ultramodern and avant-garde music captured the attention of John Cage, another one of Cowell's students. Harrison and Cage would collaborate in the years following, and engage in several romantic liaisons.

=== New York years ===
Harrison was recommended several times to study musical composition in Paris – or Europe more broadly – but resolved several times against it, due to his staunch position of promoting and elevating the status of his fellow American composers. In 1943, Harrison moved to New York City and worked as a music critic for the Herald Tribune at the behest of fellow composer and tutor Virgil Thomson. While there, he met and befriended many modernist composers of the East Coast, including Carl Ruggles, Alan Hovhaness, and most consequentially, Charles Ives. Harrison would later dedicate himself to bringing Ives to the attention of the musical world – whose works had largely been scoffed at or ignored up to that point. With the assistance of his mentor Cowell, he engraved and conducted the premiere of Ives's Symphony No. 3 (1910); receiving financial help from Ives in return. When Ives won the Pulitzer Prize for Music for that piece, he gave half of the money rewarded to Harrison. Harrison also edited a large number of Ives's works, receiving compensation often in excess of what he billed.

As fruitful as his creative endeavors were becoming, Harrison was fraught with loneliness and anxiety while in the city. A romantic relationship with a dancer in Los Angeles had to be terminated due to the move, a move which he had already begun to regret as he missed the West Coast more and more. By 1945, he had developed several painful ulcers, which he could not seem to cure as his nervous condition worsened. Despite attempting to complete new music for publishing, many of them (including one from the commission of Ives) were violently torn up and blackened out by Harrison from an extreme lack of confidence as he began to internalize the negative opinions of his compositions and public image.

In May 1947, extreme stress from homesickness, a vigorous work schedule and homophobic colleagues culminated in a severe nervous breakdown. Cage came to Harrison's aid, assisting him and bringing him to a psychiatric clinic in nearby Ossining. Harrison remained in the clinic for several weeks before transferring to the New York Presbyterian Hospital. He wrote frequently to Cowell and his wife Sidney in the first few months, expressing his deep regret and depression for what he felt to be a wasted career and adulthood. His recovery entailed nine months of extensive treatment and several more years of regular checkups, at the request of Harrison. Many of his colleagues predicted the breakdown would herald the end of his career, but Harrison continued to compose in spite of the stress plaguing him. While staying in the hospital, he composed several works, including much of his Symphony on G (1952), and regularly painted.

He decided, however, to return to California as soon as possible. In a 1948 letter addressed to his mother, Harrison wrote from the hospital, "I long to live simply and well and that just isn't possible here."

== New life in California ==
=== New compositional style ===
The crisis during his New York years prompted Harrison to heavily reevaluate his compositional language and style. He ultimately rejected the dissonant idiom he had previously cultivated, and turned toward a more sophisticated melodic lyricism in diatonic and pentatonic scales. This put him sharply at odds with the then-current academic styles, and set him apart from the ultramodernist composers he had studied and associated with. The two years following his leave from the hospital in 1949 became one of the most productive periods of Harrison's entire career, yielding impressionistic works such as the Suite for Cello and Harp, and The Perilous Chapel and Solstice. Following in the path of Canadian-American composer and friend Colin McPhee, who had done extensive research in Indonesian music in the 1930s and wrote a number of compositions incorporating Balinese and Javanese elements, Harrison's style began emulating the influence of gamelan music more clearly, if only in timbre: "It was the sound itself that attracted me. In New York, when I changed gears out of twelve tonalism, I explored this timbre. The gamelan movements in my Suite for Violin, Piano, and Small Orchestra [1951] are aural imitations of the generalized sounds of gamelan".

In the early 1950s, Harrison was given a first edition copy of Harry Partch's book on musical tuning, Genesis of a Music (1949) from Thomson. This prompted him to abandon equal temperament and begin writing music in just intonation. He strived to achieve powerful music using simple ratios, and would later consider music itself to be "emotional mathematics". In an oft-quoted comment referring to the frequency ratios used in just intonation, he said, "I'd long thought that I would love a time when musicians were numerate as well as literate. I'd love to be a conductor and say, 'Now, cellos, you gave me 10:9 there, please give me a 9:8 instead,' I'd love to get that!"

=== Teaching and time abroad ===
Harrison taught music at various colleges and universities, including Mills College from 1936 to 1939 and again from 1980 to 1985, San Jose State University, Cabrillo College, Reed College, and Black Mountain College. In 1953 he moved back to California, settling in Aptos near Santa Cruz, where he lived the rest of his life. He and Colvig purchased land in Joshua Tree, California, where they designed and built the "Harrison House Retreat", a straw bale house. He continued working on his experimental musical instruments.

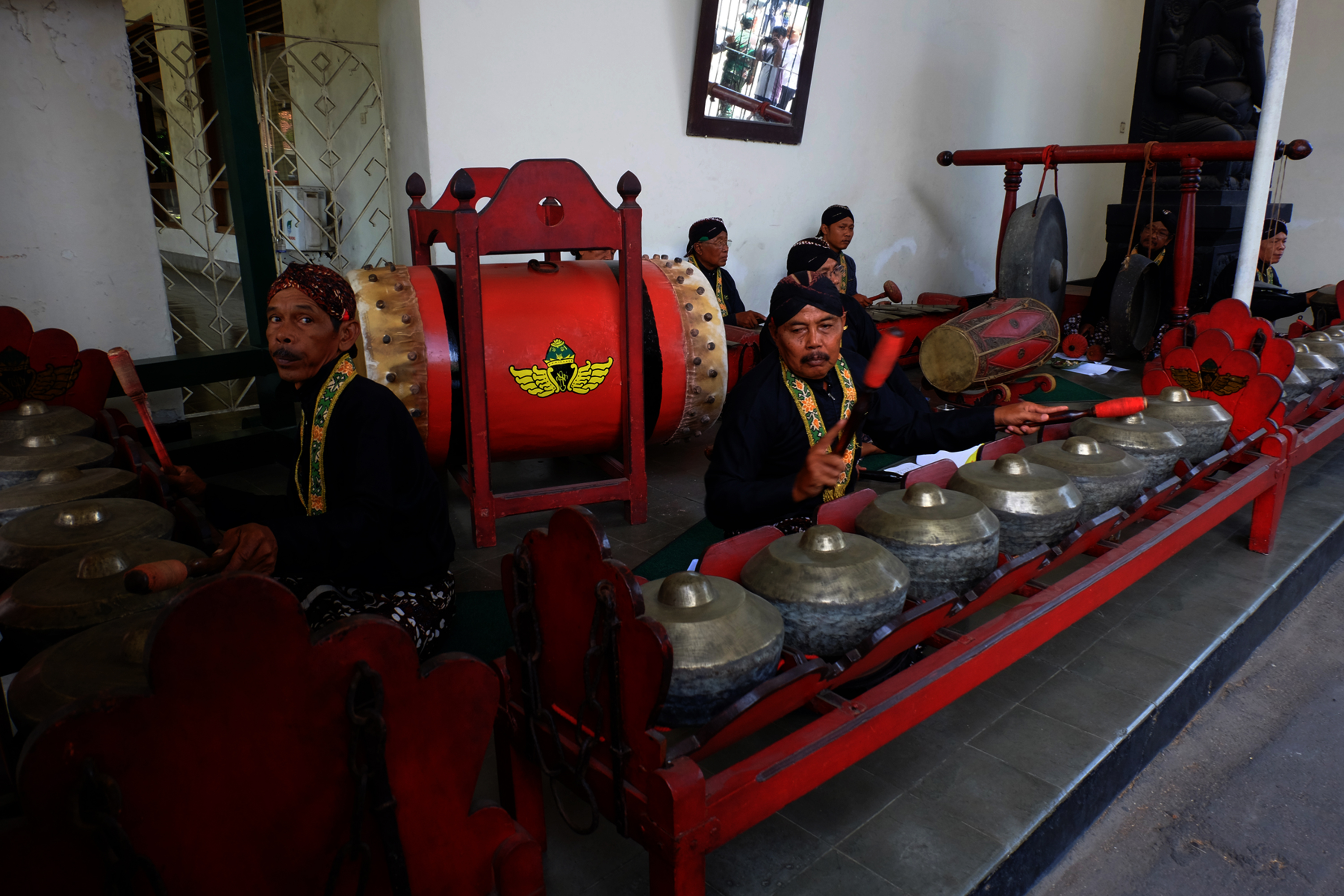
Harrison developed a deep interest in the traditional gamelan ensembles of southern Indonesia (pictured)

Although much influenced by Asian music, Harrison did not visit the continent until a 1961 trip to Japan and Korea, and a 1962 trip to Taiwan (where he studied with the zheng master Liang Tsai-Ping). He and his partner William Colvig later constructed a tuned percussion ensemble, using resonated aluminium keys and tubes, as well as oxygen tanks and other found percussion instruments. They called this "an American gamelan", to distinguish it from those in Indonesia. They also constructed gamelan-type instruments tuned to just pentatonic scales from unusual materials such as tin cans and aluminium furniture tubing. He wrote "La Koro Sutro" (in Esperanto) for these instruments and chorus, as well as Suite for Violin and American Gamelan. In addition, Harrison played and composed for the Chinese guzheng zither, and presented (with Colvig, his student Richard Dee, and the singer Lily Chin) over 300 concerts of traditional Chinese music in the 1960s and early 1970s. The poet and translator Kenneth Rexroth often read translations of classical Chinese poems in these concerts.

He was a composer-in-residence at San Jose State University in San Jose, California, during the 1960s. The university honored him with an all-Harrison concert in Morris Daley Auditorium in 1969, featuring dancers, singers, and musicians. The highlight of the concert was the world premiere of Harrison's depiction of the story of Orpheus, which used soloists, the San Jose State University a cappella choir, as well as a unique group of percussionists.

=== Activism and other endeavors ===
Harrison was outspoken about his political views, such as his pacifism (he was an active supporter of the international language Esperanto), and the fact that he was gay. He was also politically active and informed, including knowledge of gay history. He wrote many pieces with political texts or titles, writing, for instance, Homage to Pacifica for the opening of the Berkeley Headquarters of the Pacifica Foundation, and accepting commissions from the Portland Gay Men's Chorus (1988 and 1985) and by the Seattle Men's Chorus to arrange (1987) his Strict Songs, originally for eight baritones, for "a chorus of 120 male singing enthusiasts. Some of them good; some not so good. But the number is so fabulous". Lawrence Mass describes:

With Lou Harrison...being gay is something affirmative. He's proud to be a gay composer and interested in talking about what that might mean. He doesn't feel threatened that this means he won't be thought of as an American composer who is also great and timeless and universal.

Janice Giteck describes Harrison as:

unabashedly androgynous in his way of approaching creativity. He has a vital connection to the feminine as well as to the masculine. The female part is apparent in the sense of beingness. But at the same time, Lou is very male, too, ferociously active and assertive, rhythmic, pulsing, and aggressive.

Like many other 20th-century composers, Harrison found it hard to support himself with his music, and took a number of other jobs to earn a living, including record salesman, florist, animal nurse, and forestry firefighter.

== Later life ==
On November 2, 1990, the Brooklyn Philharmonic premiered Harrison's fourth symphony, which he titled "Last Symphony". He combined Native American music, ancient music, and Asian music, tying it all together with lush orchestral writing. A special inclusion was a series of "Coyote Stories," featuring texts from various sources. He made a number of revisions to the symphonies before completing a final version in 1995, which was recorded by Barry Jekowsky and the California Symphony for Argo Records at Skywalker Ranch in Nicasio, California, in March 1997. The CD also included Harrison's Elegy, to the Memory of Calvin Simmons (a tribute to the former conductor of the Oakland Symphony, who drowned in a boating accident in 1982), excerpts from Solstice, Concerto in Slendro, and Double Music (his collaboration with John Cage).

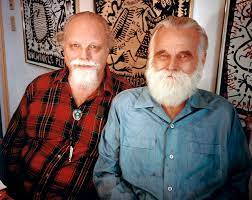
Lou Harrison and William Colvig

From the late 1980s onward, William Colvig's health began to dramatically deteriorate. He first lost his hearing, and Harrison's solution was for them to learn American Sign Language. Though Colvig decided not to communicate in ASL, Harrison continued to learn, as he was captivated by the dance-esque beauty of signing. A series of surgeries in the 1990s to replace Colvig's weak knee joints triggered a series of allergic reactions that led to significant degeneration of his physical and mental health. Harrison carefully nursed his partner, sitting with him for months, even after Colvig could no longer recognize Harrison due to his dementia. Harrison was by Colvig's side when he died on March 1, 2000.

=== Death ===
Harrison and his recent partner Todd Burlingame were driving from Chicago en route to Ohio State University in Columbus, Ohio, where a six-day festival showcasing his music – Beyond the Rockies: A Tribute to Lou Harrison at 85 – was scheduled for the week of January 30, 2003. On Sunday, February 2, they decided to stop off the highway at a Denny's in Lafayette, Indiana for lunch. While inside, Harrison began experiencing unexpected chest pains and collapsed on the scene. He was pronounced dead by the paramedics within minutes, the cause likely being from a heart attack, but no autopsy was performed. He was cremated as per his wishes.

== Harrison's music ==
=== Overview ===
Many of Harrison's early works are for percussion instruments, often made out of what would usually be regarded as junk or found objects such as garbage cans and steel brake drums. He also wrote a number of pieces using Schoenberg's twelve tone technique, including the opera Rapunzel and his Symphony on G (Symphony No. 1) (1952). Several works feature the tack piano, a kind of prepared piano with small nails inserted into the hammers to give the instrument a more percussive sound. Harrison's mature musical style is based on "melodicles", short motifs which are turned backward and upside down to create a musical mode the piece is based on. His music is typically spartan in texture but lyrical, and harmony usually simple or sometimes lacking altogether, with the focus instead being on rhythm and melody. Ned Rorem describes, "Lou Harrison's compositions demonstrate a variety of means and techniques. In general he is a melodist. Rhythm has a significant place in his work, too. Harmony is unimportant, although tonality is. He is one of the first American composers to successfully create a workable marriage between Eastern and Western forms."

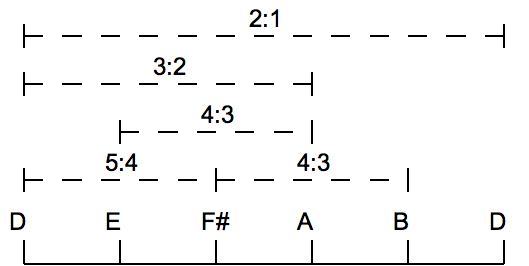
Example of just intonation tuning by Harrison, using a pentatonic scale based on perfect ratios for one of his constructed gamelan instruments

An often used technique is "interval control", in which only small number of melodic intervals, either ascending or descending, are used, without inversion. For example, for the opening of the Fourth Symphony, the permitted intervals are minor third, minor sixth, and major second.

Another component of Harrison's aesthetic is what Harry Partch would call corporeality, an emphasis on the physical and the sensual including live, human, performance and improvisation, timbre, rhythm, and the sense of space in his melodic lines, whether solo or in counterpoint, and most notably in his frequent dance collaborations. The American dancer and choreographer Mark Morris used Harrison's Serenade for Guitar [with optional percussion] (1978) as the "basis of a new kind of dance. Or, at least, one I've [Morris] never seen or done before."

Harrison and Colvig built two full Javanese-style gamelan, modeled on the instrumentation of Kyai Udan Mas at U.C. Berkeley. One was named Si Betty for the art patron Betty Freeman; the other, built at Mills College, was named Si Darius/Si Madeliene. Harrison held the Darius Milhaud Chair of Musical Composition at Mills College from 1980 until his retirement in 1985. One of his students at Mills was Jin Hi Kim. He also taught at San Jose State University and Cabrillo College.

He was awarded the Edward MacDowell Medal in 2000.

Among Harrison's better known works are the Concerto in Slendro, Concerto for Violin with Percussion Orchestra, Organ Concerto with Percussion (1973), which was given at the Proms in London in 1997; the Double Concert' (1981–82) for violin, cello, and Javanese gamelan; the Piano Concerto (1983–85) for piano tuned in Kirnberger#2 (a form of well temperament) and orchestra, which was written for Keith Jarrett; and a Concerto for Piano and Javanese Gamelan; as well as four numbered orchestral symphonies. He also wrote a large number of works in non-traditional forms. Harrison was fluent in several languages including American Sign Language, Mandarin and Esperanto, and several of his pieces have Esperanto titles and texts, most notably La Koro Sutro (1973).

Like Charles Ives, Harrison completed four symphonies. He typically combined a variety of the musical forms and languages that he preferred. This is quite apparent in the fourth symphony, recorded by the California Symphony for Argo Records, as well as his third symphony, which was performed and broadcast by Dennis Russell Davies and the San Francisco Symphony Orchestra. Russell Davies also recorded the third symphony with the Cabrillo Music Festival orchestra.

== Selected discography ==
- "ORIGINS2: forgotten percussion works, vol. 2", Percussion Art Ensemble, directed by Ron Coulter, (Kreating SounD KSD 18, December 2020) https://percussionartensemble.bandcamp.com/album/origins2-forgotten-percussion-works-vol-2
- "ORIGINS: forgotten percussion works, vol. 1", Percussion Art Ensemble, directed by Ron Coulter, (Kreating SounD KSD 4, December 2012) https://percussionartensemble.bandcamp.com/album/origins-forgotten-percussion-works-vol-1

== Films ==
- Lou Harrison: "Cherish, Conserve, Consider, Create" (dir. Eric Marin, 1986)
- Lou Harrison: A World of Music (dir. Eva Soltes, 2011)
