= Kutiyapi =

Philippine two-stringed, fretted boat-lute

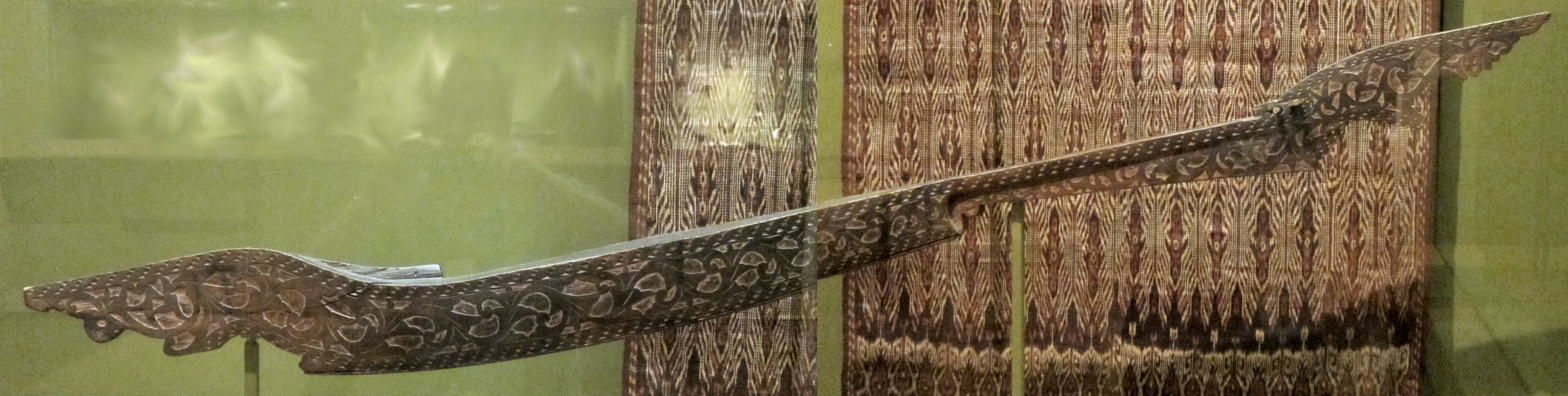
A Maguindanao kutiyapi bearing okir motifs

The kutiyapi, or kudyapi, is a Philippine two-stringed, fretted boat-lute. It is four to six feet long with nine frets made of hardened beeswax. The instrument is carved out of solid soft wood such as that from the jackfruit tree.

Common to all kudyapi instruments, a constant drone is played with one string while the other, an octave above the drone, plays the melody with a kabit or rattan pluck (commonly made from plastic nowadays). This feature, which is also common to other related Southeast Asian "boat lutes", also known as "crocodile lutes", are native to the region.

It is the only stringed instrument among the Palawano people, and one of several among other groups such as the Maranao and Manobo.

== Regional names ==
In various Philippine languages, the instrument is also called: kutyapi, kutiapi (Maguindanaon), kotyapi (Maranao), kotapi (Subanon), fegereng (Tiruray), faglong, fuglung (B'laan), kudyapi (Bukidnon and Tagbanwa), hegelong (T’boli), kuglong, kadlong, kudlong or kudlung (Manobo, Mansaka, Mandaya, Bagobo and Central Mindanao), and kusyapi (Palawan).

== In Palawan ==
For the Palawano, it is possible to arrange the beeswax frets into different patterns resulting in two different scales for the instrument. These are the binalig, a higher pitched scale similar to the pelog and accompanying style used to imitate that of the kulintang, and the dinaladay, a lower pentatonic scale used for teaching pieces of an abstract mature.

In dinaladay, several tiers of difficulty revolve around main compositions: Patentek, Patundug, Banutun and Minudel; Patentek being the most straightforward, Minudel being the most-challenging.

Binalig scale pieces include several archaic compositions now not played on the kulintang, and of these pieces Malapankuno (cock crowing) and Mapalendad are included.

Any piece with a kinukulintangan affixed to its name is one that imitates the style of the kulintang instrument, of which the Sinulog a kinukulintangan; a piece that embellishes the main melody of the kulintang's Sinulog a kangungudan, is the most popular.

The Kutiyapi may or may not be accompanied by one of several types of flutes; the palendag, suling, insi or tumpong. Singing is usually reserved for courtship purposes.

== Among the Bangsamoro peoples ==
=== Maranao ===
Among the Maranao, pieces played by using bagu and andung scales (equivalents of the binalig and dinaladay scales used by the Maguindanao), and in contrast to Maguindanao pieces, the kutiyapi is also used as an accompanying instrument to bayoka or epic chants. Examples of older andung pieces include Kangganatan and Mamayog Akun.

The Kudyapi (kotyapi) has also been as one of the instruments in several older light ensembles, including that of the kasayao-sa-singkil/kasingkil ensemble, the original musical accompaniment to the singkil dance (now rarely used in favour of conventional kulintang ensembles). This ensemble pairs the kotyapi with a jaw harp (kubing), suling, a pair of small double-headed drums known as gandangan (a drum now rarely used among the Maranao in favor of the single-headed dadabuan) and a single kulintang, in accompaniment to the bamboo poles used in the dance.

Another archaic ensemble where the kotyapi was included was the Kapanirong, or courtship ensemble, in which the kotyapi was used with a kubing, small insi flute, a two-stringed bamboo zither serongagandi, and a brass-tray tintik.

=== Dayunday performances ===
Among both the Maguindanao and Maranao, a much more recent informal styles are also used. Dayunday is a performed in front of an audience using an improvisational vocal style based on both sangel sa wata (traditional lullaby) and bayok (epic chant sung in a cappella) genres, played in either binalig or dinaladay scales, that is used during weddings, election campaigns, religious celebrations such as Eid or other large gatherings. The dayunday generally sets well known musicians from both genders against each other in verbal jest and competition.

With the advent of globalization, the importance of the kutiyapi has waned as artists have taken up the guitar instead, as it is louder.

== Among Lumad groups ==
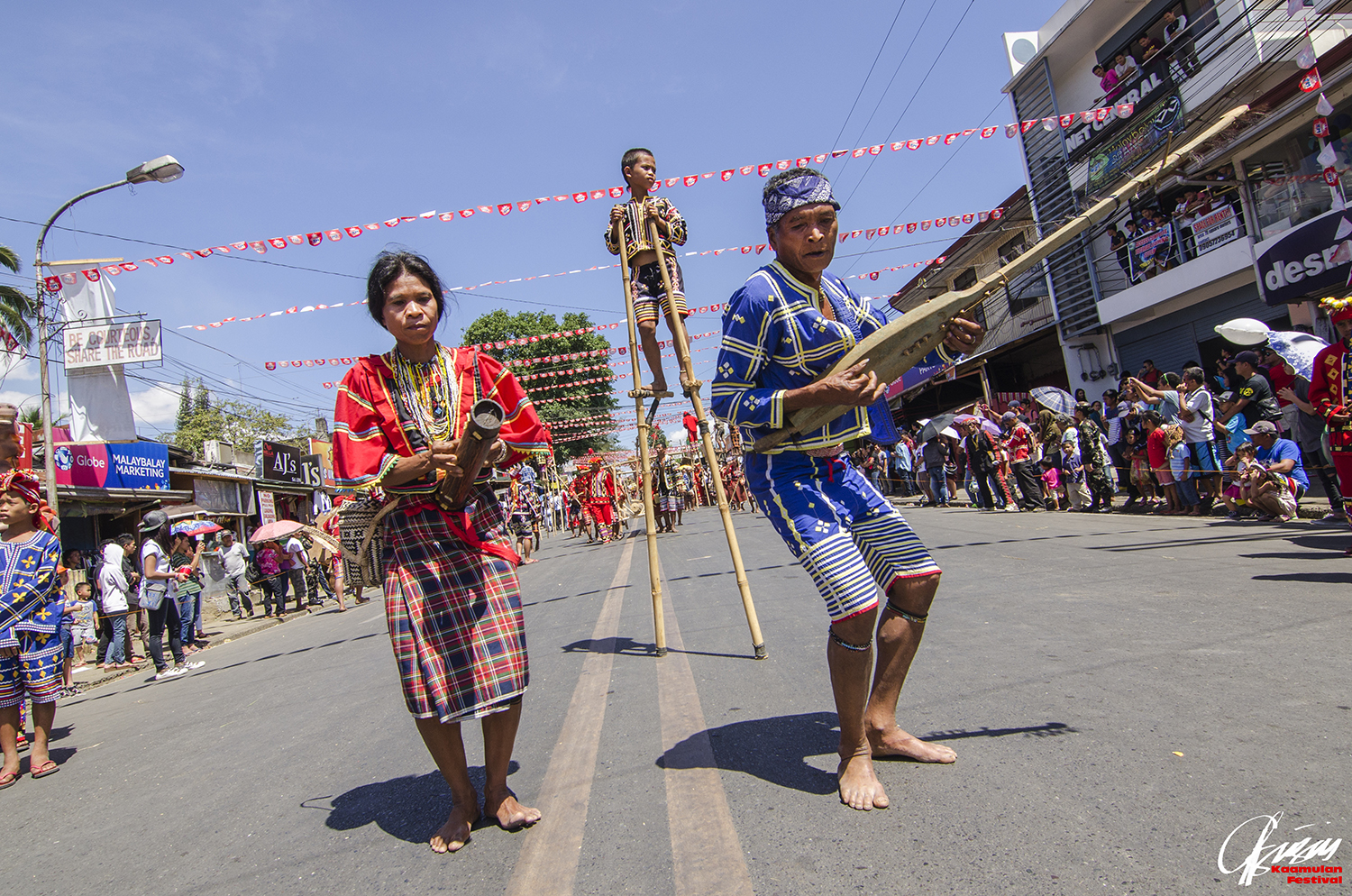
Lumad kudyapi (right) during the 2016 Kaamulan Festival of Bukidnon

Among the T'Boli, Manobo and other Lumad groups, the instrument (known as hegelung, kudyapi or fedlung) is tuned to a major pentatonic scale. Among groups like the Bagobo, the kutiyapi (kudlung) is also used as a bowed instrument and is generally played to accompany improvised songs.

A characteristic difference between Mindanaon Moro kutiyapi and the non-Islamized Lumad equivalents is the style and set up of vocal accompaniment. Among the Lumad groups, the kudyapi player and vocalist are separate performers, and vocalists use a free-flowing method of singing on top of the rhythm of the instrument, whereas among the Maguindanao and Maranao, there are set rhythms are phrases connected with the melody of the kutiyapi, with the player doubling as the vocalist (bayoka), if need be.

== In the Visayas ==
The kudyapi has been found among groups such as the Bisayans whose prevalence just like the kubing and other musical instruments are or were found in other parts of the Philippines.

The kudyapi was a kind of small lute carved out of a single piece of wood with a belly of a half a coconut shell added for resonance, with two or three wire strings plucked with a quill plectrum, and three or four frets, often of metal. The body was called sungar-sungar or burbuwaya; the neck, burubunkun; the strings, dulos; the fretboard, pidya; and the tuning pegs, birik-birik. The scroll was called apil-apil or sayong, the same as the hornlike protrusions at the ends of the ridgepole of a house. The kudyapi was only played by men, mainly to accompany their own love songs. The female equivalent was the korlong, a kind of zither made of a single node of bamboo with strings cut from the skin of the bamboo itself, each raised and tuned on two little bridges, and played with both hands like a harp. A variant form had a row of thinner canes with a string cut from each one. – William Henry Scott

== Tagalog kutyapi ==
While kutyapi was already a forgotten instrument among Tagalogs, with traces only remaining in folk songs like Sa Libis ng Nayon, a stringed instrument was historically used by Tagalogs as mentioned in the Jesuit friar Pedro Chirino's Relacion de las Islas Filipinas (1604) which is called kutyapi. Unlike its southern counterparts, the Tagalog kutyapi was a four-stringed instrument. According to Chirino:

They [the Tagalogs] are punctiliously courteous and affectionate in social intercourse and are fond of writing to one another with the utmost propriety and most delicate refinement. Consequently they are much given to serenading. And although their guitar, which they call cutyapi, is not very ingenious, nor the music very refined, it is quite pleasing, and especially to them. They play it with so much skill and ardor that they make its four wire strings speak. It is a generally accepted fact over there that by merely playing them, without saying a word, they can express and understand whatever they please, which is something that cannot be said of any other nation. The Bisayans are more artless...

Subsequent records by Spanish friars Diego de Bobadilla, S.J. (1590–1648), and Francisco Colin, S.J., who were both in the Philippines during the first half of 17th century, echoed the same thing in their writings when describing the instrument and its use by Tagalogs, but unlike the first two, Colin only mentioned the instrument having "two or more strings", not explicitly four. The instrument's spelling has varied among the different dictionaries and records made by Spaniards, with Chirino originally using the term culyapi, de Bobadilla's cutiape, and finally in the Vocabulario de la Lengua Tagala where it is variably written as coryapi and codyapi. Pedro de San Buenaventura's Vocabulario compared the instrument to both viola and guitar. Francisco de San Antonio who came to Pila, Laguna, in 1624 also equated kutyapi to rabel, writing "Rabel de los naturales (rabel of the natives)".

It is not known precisely when the instrument lost its place in Tagalog culture, as most dictionaries until the 20th century still have entries of coryapi/codyapi.

== Similar Southeast Asian instruments ==
Similar instruments played throughout the region include the Sapeh of Borneo, Sundatang of Sabah, and the Crocodile lutes of Mainland Southeast Asia. Although they share a similar name, the Kacapi of Sundanese is a zither, and not a lute.

== See also ==
- Lute
- String instrument
- List of string instruments
