= Sundanese music =

Sundanese traditional music, Indonesia

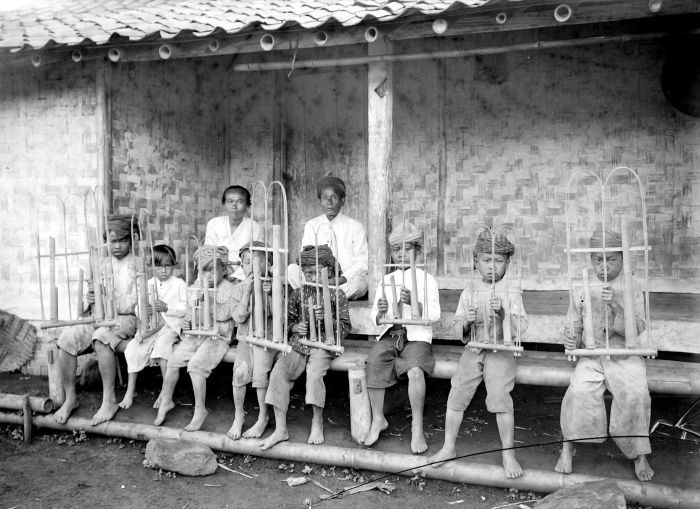
Sundanese boys playing the Angklung in 1918

Sundanese Music (Sundanese: ᮊᮛᮝᮤᮒᮔ᮪ ᮞᮥᮔ᮪ᮓ, Karawitan Sunda) is an umbrella term that encompasses diverse musical traditions of the West Java and Banten in western part of Java, Indonesia. The term of "West Java" is preferred by scholars in this field. The word "Sundanese" originally referred to western part of Java Island and has a strong association with the highly centralized Sunda Kingdom based on Java Island and its high culture practiced by the nobleman class in its capital Parahyangan. By contrast, scholars who cover a much broader region lay emphasis on folk culture.

The people of Sundanese, who inhabit the westernmost third of the island of Java, are sometimes wrongly referred to by foreigners as Javanese. Sundanese culture, language and music are quite distinct from those of the Javanese people of Central and East Java - although of course there are also elements in common. In Sunda there is a bewildering diversity of musical genres, musical composition and tuning systems are recognizably different.

== Traditional instruments ==
In Sundanese music the term musical instrument or musical sound produced in various ways is called Waditra.

In Sundanese music, there are several Waditra, namely Waditra Tiup (inflatable), Waditra Takol (beat), Waditra Tepak (tap), Waditra Keset (mat) and Waditra Geter (vibrate).

=== Aerophones ===
- Suling, are made mainly of "tamiang" bamboo (Schizostachyum blumei, Nees), a long, thin-walled bamboo tube. The mouthpiece of the suling is circled with a thin band made of rattan near a small hole.
- Toleat, similar to a Suling, but the sound produced is similar to a Saxophone and differs from blowing techniques.
- Tarompét, a kind of trumpet sound, a typical variant of Sundanese music, which is made of wood and has seven sound holes.
- Goong Awi, a narrow open tube of bamboo about 4 cm in diameter and 110 cm long is placed inside a larger bamboo tube about 15 cm in diameter and of similar length, closed by a natural node at the lower end.

=== Idiophones ===
- Angklung, instrument consisting of two to four bamboo tubes suspended in a bamboo frame, bound with rattan cords. The tubes are carefully whittled and cut by a master craftsperson to produce certain notes when the bamboo frame is shaken or tapped. Each Angklung produces a single note or chord, so several players must collaborate in order to play melodies. On November 18, 2010, UNESCO officially recognized the Indonesian angklung as a Masterpiece of the Oral and Intangible Heritage of Humanity.

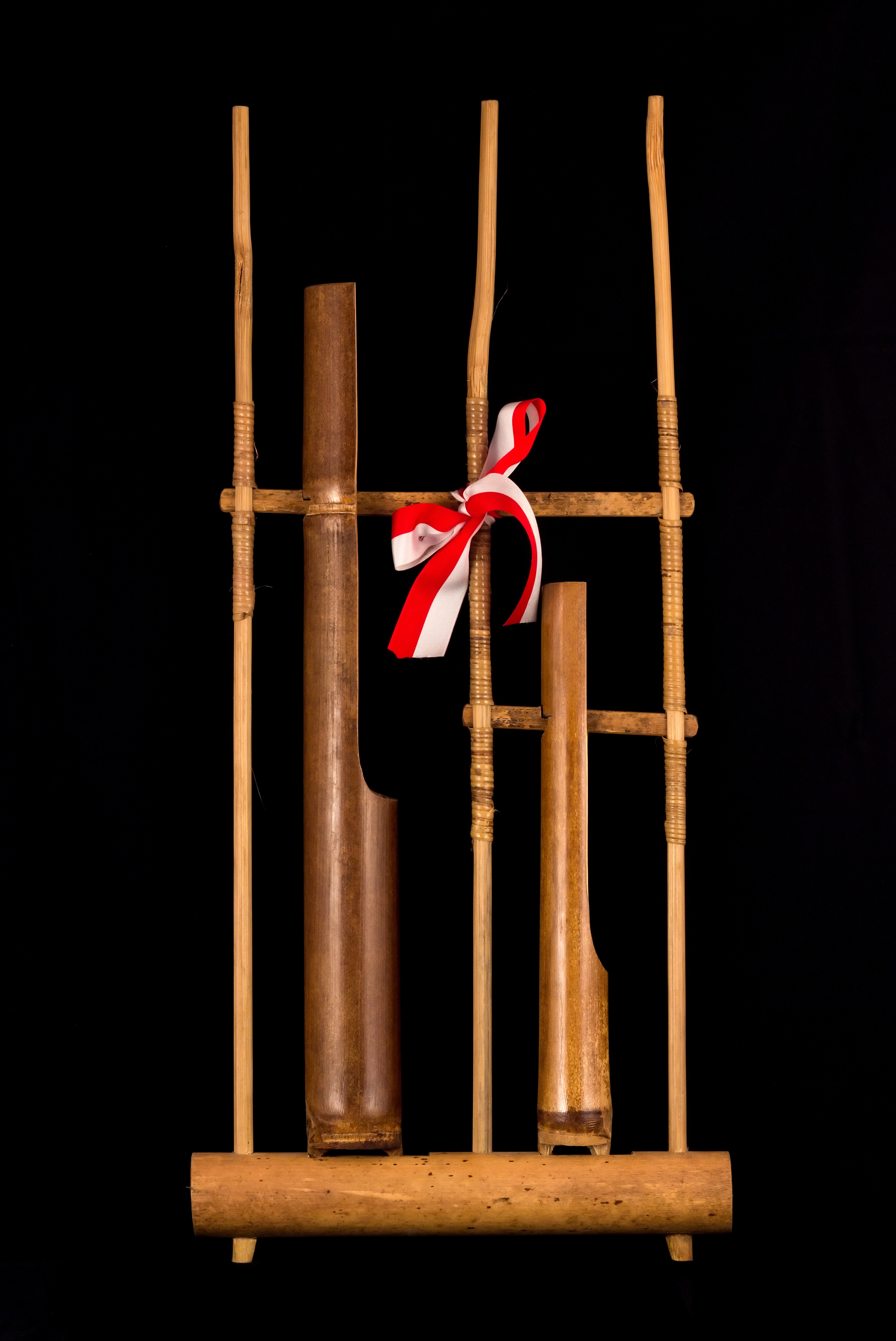
Single pitch angklung, for use in orchestras

- Gamelan Sunda, a multi-timbre ensemble consisting of metallophones, xylophones, flutes, gongs, voices, as well as bowed and plucked strings.

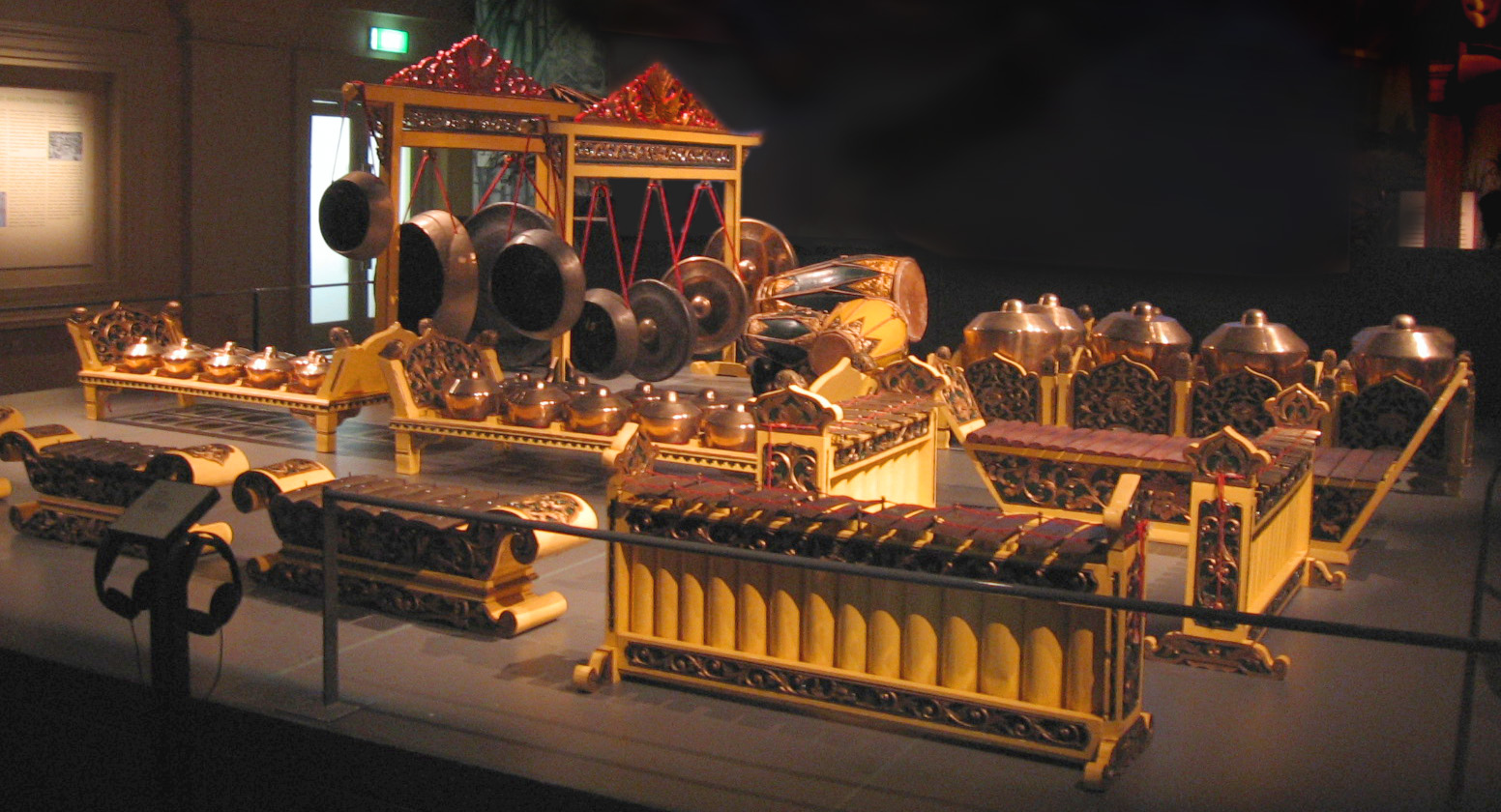
Gamelan in Asian Civilisations Museum, Singapore

- Calung, consists of multiple bamboo tubes which are struck at the base to produce a woody sound.
- Karinding, a musical instrument made of a tube of bambu about one foot long and one inch in bore, at the end of which is held a small instrument with a tongue to it . This instrument is struck by the finger and blown upon, when a sound like a Jew's harp.

=== Membranophones ===
- Kendang, instruments are to be made from the wood of jackfruit, coconuts or cempedak. Buffalo hide is often used for the bam (inferior surface which emits low-pitch beats) while soft goatskin is used for the chang (superior surface which emits high-pitch beats).
- Dogdog, a wooden musical instrument in the shape of a cylinder, the center is made of a hole, with one side covered with a Goat Skin membrane, which consists of 4 sets of instruments with different beats.
- Dogdog Lojor, a wooden musical instrument is in the form of an elongated cylinder. The center is made of a hollow, with one side covered with a membrane of Goatskin. This goat skin is stretched by being tied with a rope made of bamboo skin. The degree of stretching of the goat skin determines the sound produced.
- Celempung, a musical instrument made of sharp cut bamboo, which utilizes the resonant waves present in the segment of the bamboo culm.

=== Chordophones ===
- Kacapi, the instrument has a resonance box with the bottom exposed to allow the sound to come out, the sides of this type of kacapi taper inward from top to bottom, which gives the instrument the shape of a boat. In ancient times, it was made directly from solid wood by means of a hole. This is on par with Guzheng.
- Jentreng, a kind of lute instrument with seven strings. The size is much smaller when compared to kacapi in general. Made from flower wood (ylang) or jackfruit wood.
- Tarawangsa, stringed instruments have a resonator made of wood with a long neck with the number of strings between 2 and 3 strands.

== Sundanese tone notation ==
=== Sundanese Daminatila ===
It's a kind of numbered musical notation like the solfège, but it uses a different system: high numbers correspond to low tones, and vice versa. This system might seem to be counterintuitive to people who are already familiar with the western solfège. There are only 5 notes used in each scales: 1, 2, 3, 4, and 5, read as da, mi, na, ti, and la. The absolute tones depend on the scale used and the base frequency, which don't adhere to western standards. Traditional angklung have some common scales: saléndro, degung/pélog, and sorog/madenda.

=== Diatonic ===
Diatonic notation for angklung use a numbered musical notation in Indonesia, similar notation like Jianpu, but with some different standards, like the placement of rhythm lines positions and chord notations. The musical notation is written based on movable do. The musical notation displays 1 as relative do, 2 as relative re, etc. Higher octave marked with a dot above, and lower octave marked with a dot below.

Also, some alternatives notations is writing the exact written numbers on the single angklung to the musical sheet, usually marked 0-31, 0 is the lowest tone and 31 is the highest tone.

Some angklung types contains more than one notes usually marked with English chord notation, like C, Dm, Em, F, G, G7, Am, etc. This type of angklung is used for accompanying a musical piece.

== Contemporary music ==
=== Pop Sunda ===
Pop Sunda or Sundanese pop is Indonesian pop music which is a blend of traditional Sundanese music with contemporary western pop music.

== See also ==
- Music of Indonesia
- Music of Java
- Sundanese people
