= Implosion =

Implosion can refer to:

== Physics ==
- Implosion (mechanical process)
- Building implosion
- Implosion-type nuclear weapon
- In phonetics, an airstream mechanism associated with implosive consonants
- Gravitational collapse (and more specifically, core collapse) in cosmology
- Parabolic implosion in complex dynamics

== Art, entertainment and media ==
=== Books ===
- Implosion (novel), by D. F. Jones
- Implosion, a 1983 book by Kathy Acker
- Implosion, a 2013 romantic novel by Berinn Rae
- Implosion, a non-fiction book by Joel C. Rosenberg

=== Film and TV ===
- Implosion, a 1983 short film directed by E. Elias Merhige
- Implosion, a 2009 German film with Marie Tourell Søderberg
- Implosion, a 2011 German film with Eriq Ebouaney
- Implosion, a 2016 film by Steven Woloshen

=== Music ===
- Implosions (album), 1977 album by Stephan Micus
- Imploding the Mirage, 2020 album by the Killers
  - Imploding the Mirage Tour, 2021–2023 concert tour by the Killers
- Implosion, 2005 album by Cybotron
- Implosion, 1987 album by False Prophets
- Implosions, 1987 album by Stanley Clarke
  - Implosions, 1987 video album by Stanley Clarke

=== Video games ===
- Implosion - Never Lose Hope, a 2015 iOS game by Rayark

== See also ==
- Implode (disambiguation)
