= SambaSunda =

Indonesian music group

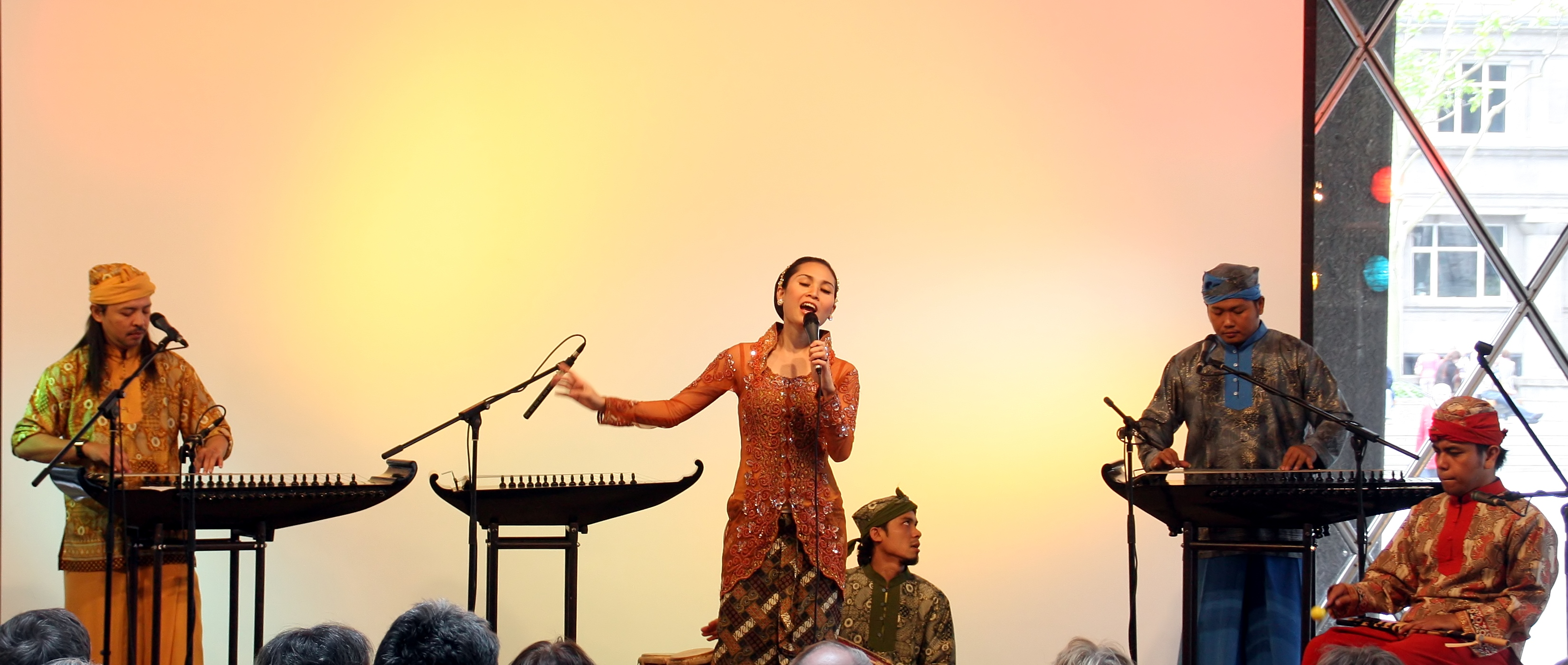
SambaSunda performance in Cologne 2010

SambaSunda (originally known as CBMW) is an Indonesian ethnic music fusion group based in Bandung, the capital and cultural centre of Sundanese culture in Indonesia. SambaSunda is a 14-piece ensemble bringing together a pan-Indonesian array of instruments and influences to create a new style of gamelan orchestra. Their style is mainly influenced by Sundanese culture, such as gamelan and degung Sunda, Tembang Sunda, and Kacapi suling.

The classic sounds of the traditional instruments evoke not only the past but also the bustling, urban energy of Bandung today. Recorded in that city's Jugala studios, Berekis Album brings a full sound palette from the deep resonance of the mighty gongs to the silvery eloquence of the bamboo flute.

SambaSunda are led by composer and multi-instrumentalist Ismet Ruchimat, who started his career in 1989 in Gugum Gumbira's famous Jugala Orchestra and has appeared on a number of international recording projects: with Spanish percussionist Vidal Paz ("Sunda-Africa", Globestyle); Indian flautist, Hariprasad Chaurasia ("Moon Magic", BMG India); the Madagascan group, Tarika ("Soul Makassar", Sakay); and on the Kartini label with Sabah Habas Mustapha & the Jugala Allstars ("Jalan Kopo" and "So La Li").
