= Athos (album) =

Studio album by Stephan Micus
- Released: 1994
- Recorded: November 1993 – February 1994
- Studio: MCM Studios
- Genre: World fusion, new age, ambient
- Label: ECM; ECM 1551
- Producer: Stephan Micus

Stephan Micus chronology
| To the Evening Child (1992) | Athos (1994) | The Garden of Mirrors (1997) |

Athos is an album by Stephan Micus recorded between November 1993 – February 1994 and released on ECM in 1994.

== Background ==
Based on a three-day visit to Mount Athos, Micus tries to capture his experiences with the Greek Orthodox liturgy he experienced in the monasteries there, framing it with pieces that evoke his emotions at going to and leaving the isolated peninsula. Between them he recreates the liturgical experience of the services during his stay, in six alternating pieces of night and day.

As in his other works, Micus uses a combination of traditional instruments from various cultures to capture the feel of the monastery. These include: the sattar (a bowed 10-string instrument used by the Uyghur), the shakuhachi (a Japanese bamboo flute), the suling (a reed flute from Bali), the ney (a Middle Eastern flute), and 22 flowerpots, filled with water, which he plays with his hands and with mallets. These instruments are only used in the pieces representing the days on Mount Athos.

To emulate the Greek Orthodox tradition of not using musical instruments in their services, his pieces devoted to the nights are performed by a 22-man choir singing prayers to the Virgin Mary.

== Track listing ==
1. "On the Way" (Bavarian zither, sattar) – 4:57
2. "The First Night" (22 voices) – 5:35
3. "The First Day" (shakuhachi solo) – 6:38
4. "The Second Night" (22 voices) – 4:47
5. "The Second Day" (suling, 22 flowerpots) – 3:32
6. "The Third Night" (22 voices) – 6:19
7. "The Third Day" (nay solo) – 5:55
8. "On the Way Back" (2 Bavarian zithers, sattar, 11 voices) – 8:58

== Personnel ==
- Stephan Micus – Bavarian zither, sattar, shakuhachi, suling, nay, 22 flowerpots, voice
