= The Garden of Mirrors =

Studio album by Stephan Micus
- Released: 1997
- Recorded: 1995–1996
- Genre: World fusion, new age, ambient
- Length: 51:15
- Label: ECM; ECM 1632
- Producer: Stephan Micus

Stephan Micus chronology
| Athos (1994) | The Garden of Mirrors (1997) | Desert Poem (2001) |

The Garden of Mirrors is an album by Stephan Micus recorded between 1995–1996 and released on ECM the following year.

AllMusic described the album as "a set of gentle pieces constructed largely around acoustic sounds and simple percussion."

== Background ==
Like his previous efforts, Micus plays every instrument via overdubbing: he also provides all of the voices for the 20-man chorus in three of the tracks.

Micus's inspiration for this album was two traditional low-range West African harps that he studied in Gambia: the bolombatto and the sinding. When playing these two instruments, Micus claims to have identified with early African American music, which they influenced, claiming that the bassline in jazz was influenced by these harps. Other instruments used by Micus include steel drums and four different flutes: the Japanese shakuhachi, the Balinese suling, the Irish tin whistle, and the Egyptian ney.

== Track listing ==
1. "Earth"
2. "Passing Cloud"
3. "Violeta"
4. "Flowers in Chaos"
5. "In the High Valleys"
6. "Gates of Fire"
7. "Mad Bird"
8. "Night Circles"
9. "Words of Truth"

== Personnel ==
Stephen Micus
