= Nomad Songs =

Studio album by Stephan Micus
- Released: June 19, 2015
- Recorded: 2012–2014
- Studio: MCM Studios
- Genre: ambient rock
- Length: 55:56
- Label: ECM 2409
- Producer: Stephan Micus

Stephan Micus chronology
Panagia (2013)	Nomad Songs (2015)	Inland Sea (2017)

Professional ratings
Review scores
Source	Rating
All About Jazz	4.5/5 stars

Nomad Songs is the twenty-third studio album by German world musician Stephan Micus, recorded over three years and released on ECM in June 2015. Always seeking new traditional instruments, Nomad Songs sees the addition of two new instruments to Micus's repertoire: the genbri (a Moroccan lute) and the ndingo (a Botswanan lamellophone).

== Reception ==
In a four-and-a-half star review for All About Jazz, John Kelman said "Nomad Songs is, despite the perennially pensive and reflective nature of his entire body of work, a shift from the more conceptually focused Panagia, which was based around prayers to the Virgin Mary."

== Track listing ==
All tracks are written by Stephan Micus

No.	Title	Length
1.	"Everywhere, Nowhere"	4:40
2.	"Leila"	5:27
3.	"The Promise"	8:19
4.	"The Stars"	2:47
5.	"The Spring"	2:53
6.	"The Blessing"	4:30
7.	"The Feast"	5:04
8.	"Laughing at Thunder"	4:21
9.	"Sea of Grass"	5:01
10.	"The Dance"	6:12
11.	"Under the Chinar Trees"	6:42
Total length:		55:56

== Personnel ==
- Stephan Micus – ndingo, genbri, steel-string guitar, suling, voice, ney, rawap, rebab, twelve-string guitar, fourteen-string guitar, tin whistle, shakuhachi
