= Panambih =

Panambih is metrical sung form of poetry, and a more modern version of the Tembang sunda of Indonesia.
