= Stephan Micus =

German composer

- Born: 19 January 1953 (age 73); Stuttgart, Germany
- Genres: Avant-garde rock, ambient rock
- Occupations: Musician, singer
- Instrument: Multi-instrumentalist
- Years active: 1976–present
- Label: ECM
- Website: www.stephanmicus.com

Stephan Micus (/ʃtɛˈfɑːn ˈmiːkəs/; born 19 January 1953) is a German musician and composer, whose musical style is heavily influenced by his study of traditional instruments and musical techniques from Japan, India, South America, and other countries. With the exception of his album The Music of Stones (1989), he plays all the instruments on his recordings, combining styles from different countries and using the instruments in unprecedented ways in each of his pieces. He often uses layers of a single instrument to create unusual combinations of sounds. He is one of the few ECM Records artists whose records are not produced by Manfred Eicher. He has mixed instruments from around the world, or used whatever was at hand: stones, ordinary flowerpots tuned with water, and his voice.

Micus plays bagpipes, Japanese bamboo flute, rabab, steel drums, and zither, among other instruments.

== Discography ==
- 1976 - Archaic Concerts (Caroline/Virgin)
- 1977 - Implosions (Japo/ECM)
- 1978 - Behind Eleven Deserts (Wind)
- 1978 – Till the End of Time (Japo/ECM)
- 1981 - Koan (Japo/ECM) (recorded in 1977)
- 1982 – Wings over Water (Japo/ECM)
- 1983 – Listen to the Rain (Japo/ECM)
- 1985 – East of the Night (Japo/ECM)
- 1986 – Ocean (ECM)
- 1987 – Twilight Fields (ECM)
- 1989 – The Music of Stones (ECM)
- 1990 – Darkness and Light (ECM)
- 1992 – To the Evening Child (ECM)
- 1994 – Athos (ECM)
- 1997 – The Garden of Mirrors (ECM)
- 2001 – Desert Poems (ECM)
- 2002 – Towards the Wind (ECM)
- 2004 – Life (ECM)
- 2006 – On the Wing (ECM)
- 2008 – Snow (ECM)
- 2010 – Bold as Light (ECM)
- 2013 – Panagia (ECM)
- 2015 – Nomad Songs (ECM)
- 2017 – Inland Sea (ECM)
- 2019 – White night (ECM)
- 2021 – Winter's End (ECM)
- 2023 - Thunder (ECM)
- 2024 - To the Rising Moon (ECM)
- 2026 - Traces in the Sand (ECM)
