= Twilight Fields =

Studio album by Stephan Micus
- Released: 1988
- Recorded: November 1987
- Studio: Tonstudio Bauer; Ludwigsburg, W. Germany
- Genre: World fusion, new age, ambient
- Length: 46:03
- Label: ECM 1358
- Producer: Stephan Micus

Stephan Micus chronology
Ocean (1986)	Twilight Fields (1988)	The Music of Stones (1989)

Twilight Fields is an album by German multi-instrumentalist and composer Stephan Micus recorded in November 1987 and released on ECM the following year.

== Reception ==
The AllMusic review by Jim Brenholts awarded the album 3 stars stating "Twilight Fields is a set of smooth, acoustic ambience from Stephan Micus, a master of the craft. He uses flutes, marimbas, xylophones, and ethnic percussion to generate this atmospheric experience."

Professional ratings
Review scores
Source	Rating
AllMusic	3/5 stars

== Track listing ==
All compositions by Stephan Micus

1. "Part I" - 8:35
2. "Part II" - 8:00
3. "Part III" - 4:35
4. "Part IV" - 10:00
5. "Part V"- 15:01

== Personnel ==
- Stephan Micus – shakuhachi, Bavarian zither, hammered dulcimer, nay, flowerpots
