= Implode =

Implode may refer to:

== Arts ==
- Implode (album), a 1999 album by industrial group Front Line Assembly
- "Implode", a song by Slayer from the album Repentless
- String functions#join, implode() is the join string function in PHP

== See also ==
- Implosion (disambiguation)
