= Ocean (Stephan Micus album) =

Studio album by Stephan Micus
- Released: 1986
- Recorded: January 1986
- Studio: Tonstudio Bauer; Ludwigsburg, W. Germany
- Genre: World fusion, new age, ambient
- Length: 50:17
- Label: ECM; ECM 1318

Stephan Micus chronology
East of the Night (1985)	Ocean (1986)	Twilight Fields (1987)

Ocean is a solo album by German composer and multi-instrumentalist Stephan Micus recorded in January 1986 and released on ECM later that year.

== Reception ==
The AllMusic review by Jim Brenholts awarded the album 4 stars stating "Ocean is a set of acoustic ambient performances from Stephan Micus. He uses exotic instruments and techniques that give this disc electronic timbre.... The natural sonorities of these devices create vast atmospheres with organic timbres. The soundscapes penetrate and enhance brainwave activity. This great CD will appeal to fans of Robert Rich, Klaus Wiese, and Riley Lee."

Professional ratings
Review scores
Source	Rating
AllMusic	4/5 stars

== Track listing ==
All compositions by Stephan Micus

1. "Part I: Voice, 6 Hammered Dulcimers, Nay" - 8:13
2. "Part II: 4 Sho, Shakuhachi, 3 Bavarian Zithers, 2 Hammered Dulcimers" - 19:20
3. "Part III: 3 Hammered Dulcimers, Shakuhachi" - 15:46
4. "Part IV: Sho Solo" - 7:13

== Personnel ==
- Stephan Micus – voice, sho, nay, shakuhachi, Bavarian zither, hammered dulcimer
