= Tembang Sunda =

Indonesian music genre

Tembang sunda, also called seni mamaos cianjuran, is a style of classical vocal music that originated in the Priangan highland of western Java. Unlike Sundanese gamelan music, tembang Sunda was developed in the court of the regent Kabupaten Cianjur during the Dutch colonial period (mid-nineteenth century). The traditional vocal portion is sung free verse poetry, the instrumental accompaniment being performed on kacapi (zither), suling (bamboo flute) and sometimes also rebab (violin). A more modern, and metrical, form of lyrics exists that is called panambih.

Kacapi suling is played to ornament the vocals, and also at interludes between songs at a typical Tembang Sunda performance. Two kacapis (box zithers), the higher pitched kacapi rincik and the lower pitched kacapi indung, and the suling flute are the instruments used for kacapi suling. Kacapi suling has instrumental pieces performed in two different scales; the first four in laras pelog convey a light mood, the last four in laras sorog are more slow and grave. The change to laras sorog usually takes place at midnight and lasts til sunrise.

== See also ==
- West Java
- Pantun Sunda
- Sunda kingdom
- Music of Indonesia
