= Kacapi suling =

Indonesian traditional musical instruments

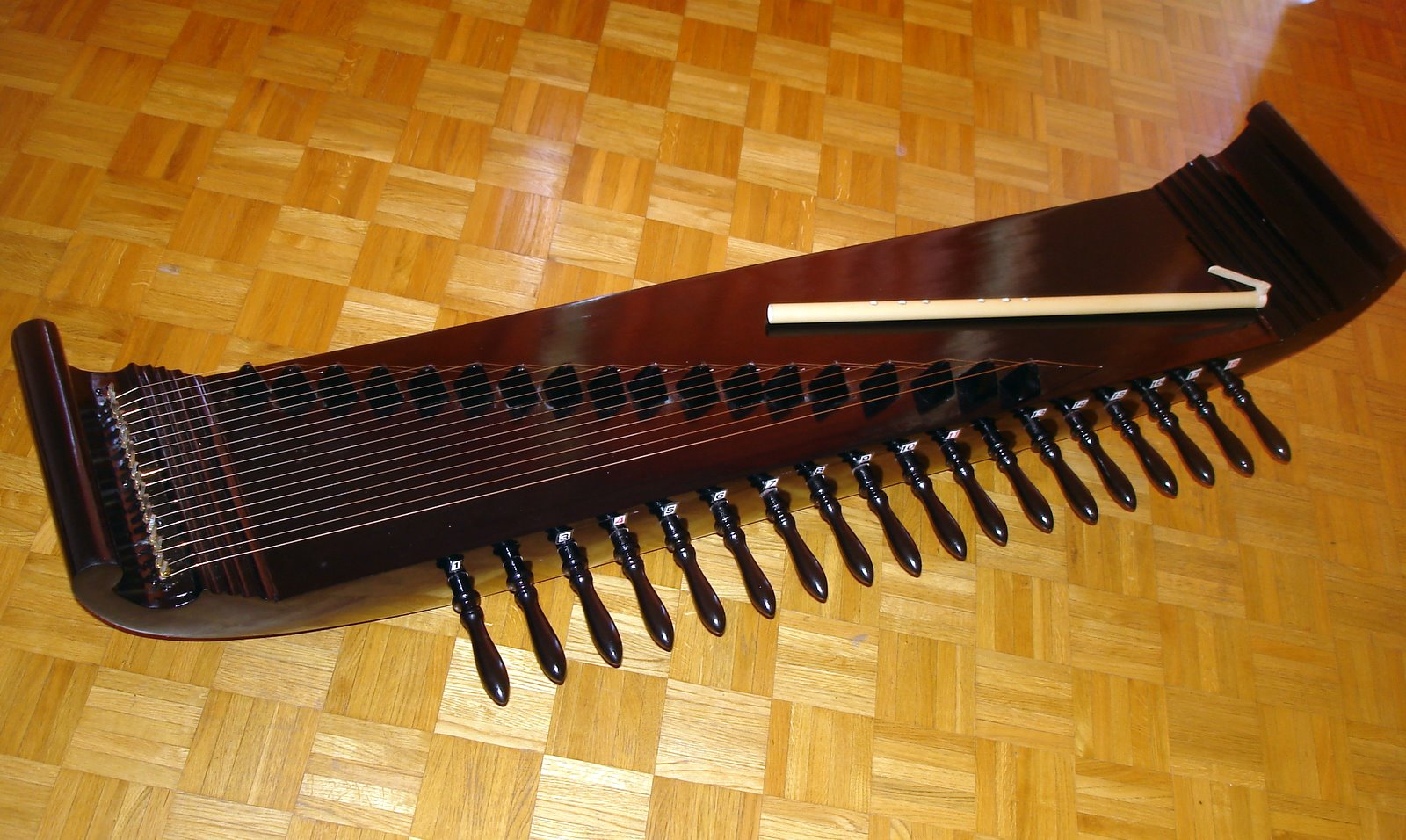
Kacapi and suling

Kacapi suling is a form of Sundanese music from Indonesia. It is essentially tembang Sunda minus vocals, and also at interludes between songs at a typical Tembang Sunda performance. The higher pitched kacapi rincik, the lower pitched kacapi indung and the suling flute are the instruments used for kacapi suling. Kacapi suling has instrumental pieces performed in two different scales; the first four in laras pelog convey a light mood, the last four, in laras sorog are more slow and grave. The change to laras sorog usually takes place at midnight and lasts until sunrise.

Many hotels in Indonesia, especially in Bali, and other parts of the world like in Shenzhen, China play this Sundanese music genre in their lobbies. Malaysia itself invited Sundanese kacapi suling experts from the Province of West Java to teach their expertise in Malaysia.

== See also ==
- Tembang Sunda
- Kacapi
- Suling
