= Gamelan degung =

Indonesian traditional musical instruments

Gamelan Degung
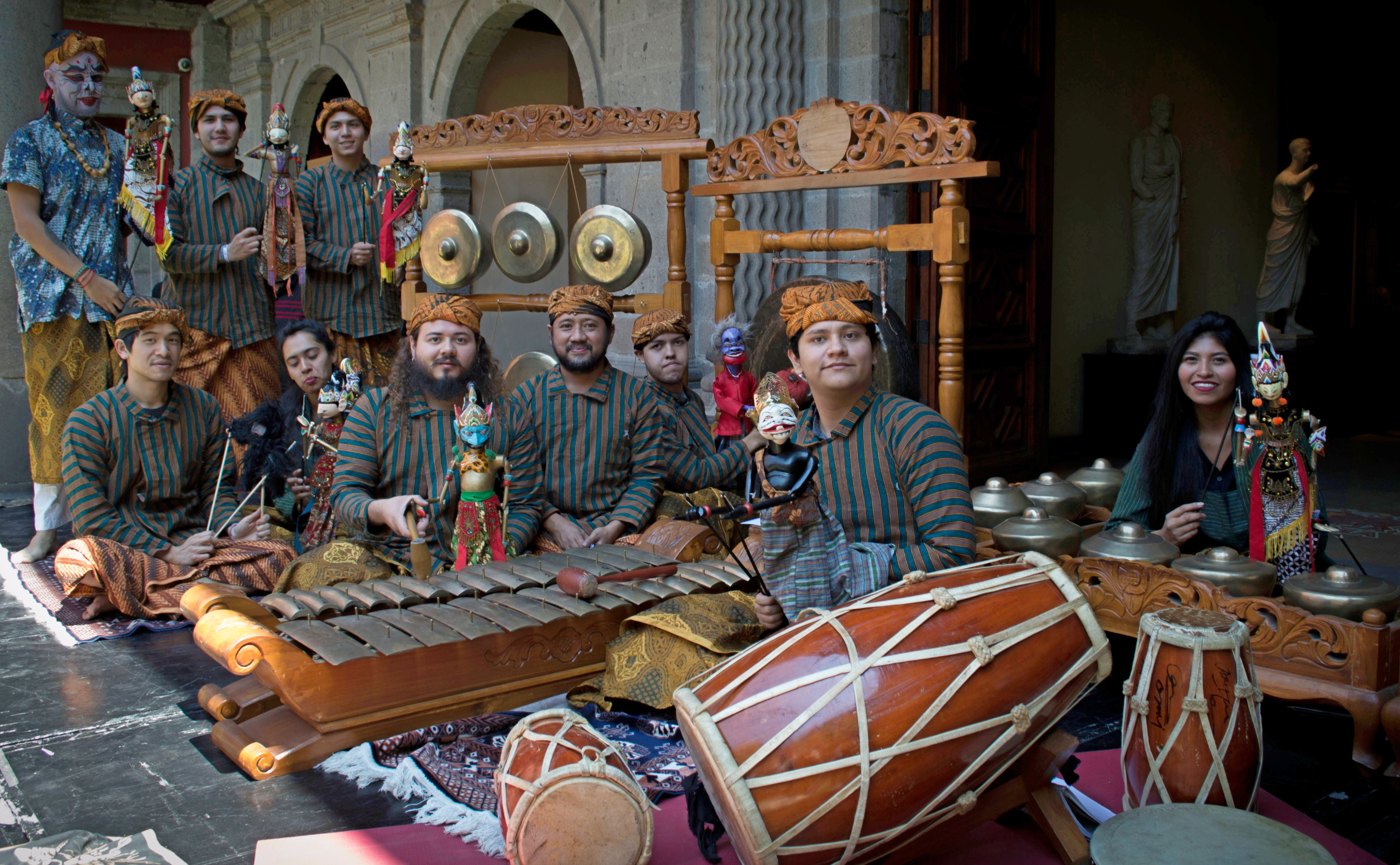
- A gamelan degung player
- Classification: Percussion instrument; Idiophone; Gong
- Inventor: Sundanese
- Developed: Indonesia (West Java)

More articles or information
- Gamelan

Gamelan
- UNESCO Intangible Cultural Heritage
- Country: Indonesia
- Reference: 01607
- Region: Asia and the Pacific

Inscription history
- Inscription: 2021 (16th session)
- List: Representative

Gamelan degung is a form of Sundanese musical ensemble that uses a subset of modified gamelan instruments with a particular mode of degung scale. The instruments are manufactured under local conditions in towns in West Java such as Bogor and Bandung. Degung music is often played at public gatherings in West Java, such as at local elections, as well as many other events. There is international interest in degung as well among communities in other countries interested in Indonesian and gamelan music.

Gamelan degung is also playable in madenda scale, which is included in the set as a complementary tone, usually marked as a -3/ni tone in the set. Playing gamelan degung in this scale requires the substitution of the 3/na metal bars into -3/ni tones on all instruments.

Gamelan tuning use its da/1 note as the reference. The tuning of a degung set should match with common suling tunings. A suling usually sold based on the length of the tube, such as 56 cm, 54 cm, etc. Shorter tube has higher base note. A 56 cm suling corresponds with da/1≈G.

degung and madenda scale comparison
Degung	5	4	3		2	1
Madenda	5	4		-3	2	1
reading	la	ti	na	ni	mi	da
surupan 56	B	C	D	E	F#	G
surupan 54	A#	B	C#	D#	E#	F#
surupan 52	A	Bb	C	D	E	F

== Instruments ==
The instrumentation of gamelan degung is quite flexible. It may include:

- bonang/kolènang: two rows of seven small bulbous gongs. It differs from its Javanese counterpart in that the rows are each placed on either side of the player.
- saron/peking: a high-pitched bronze metallophone with fourteen keys. Usually, there are two sarons in a single set.
- panerus: another bronze metallophone, similar to the peking but pitched an octave lower.
- jengglong: six bulbous gongs suspended from the same frame. Could be played like bonang, or hanged.
- goong ageung: a large gong.
- pancer: a smaller gong, secondary gong.
- A set of kendang, consisting of one large (kendang indung) and two small double-sided drums (kulantér).
- suling degung: a four-holed bamboo flute.
- suling kawih: a six-holed bamboo flute, interchangeably used with suling degung
- gambang: a wooden xylophone.
- kacapi: a zither.

In classical degung, the bonang serves as a conductor for the whole ensemble. Except in certain modern compositions, it is rarely absent.

== Gallery ==
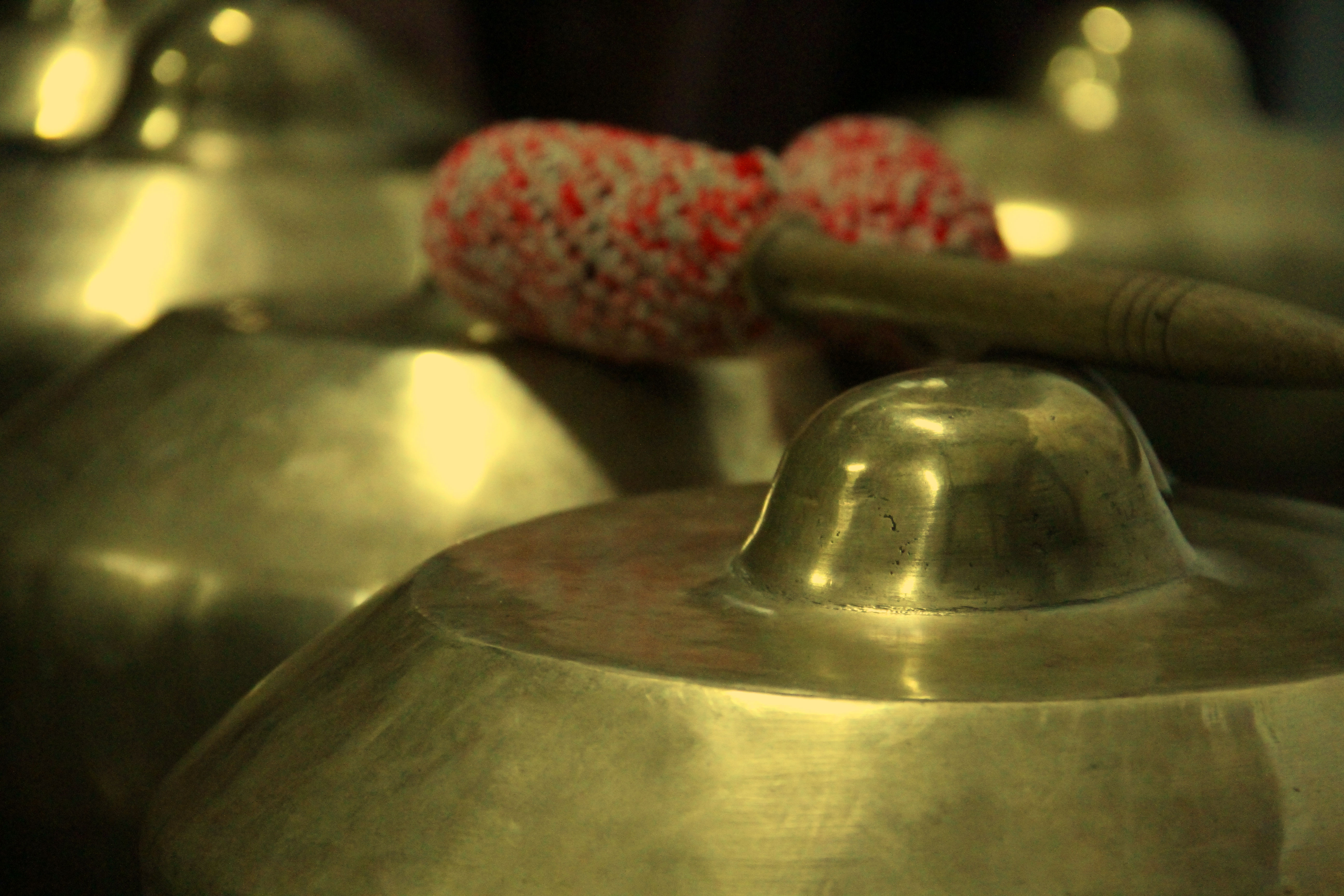
Closeup of a bonang from gamelan degung

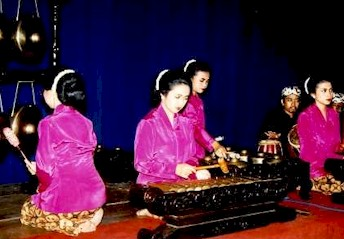
Sundanese gamelan degung

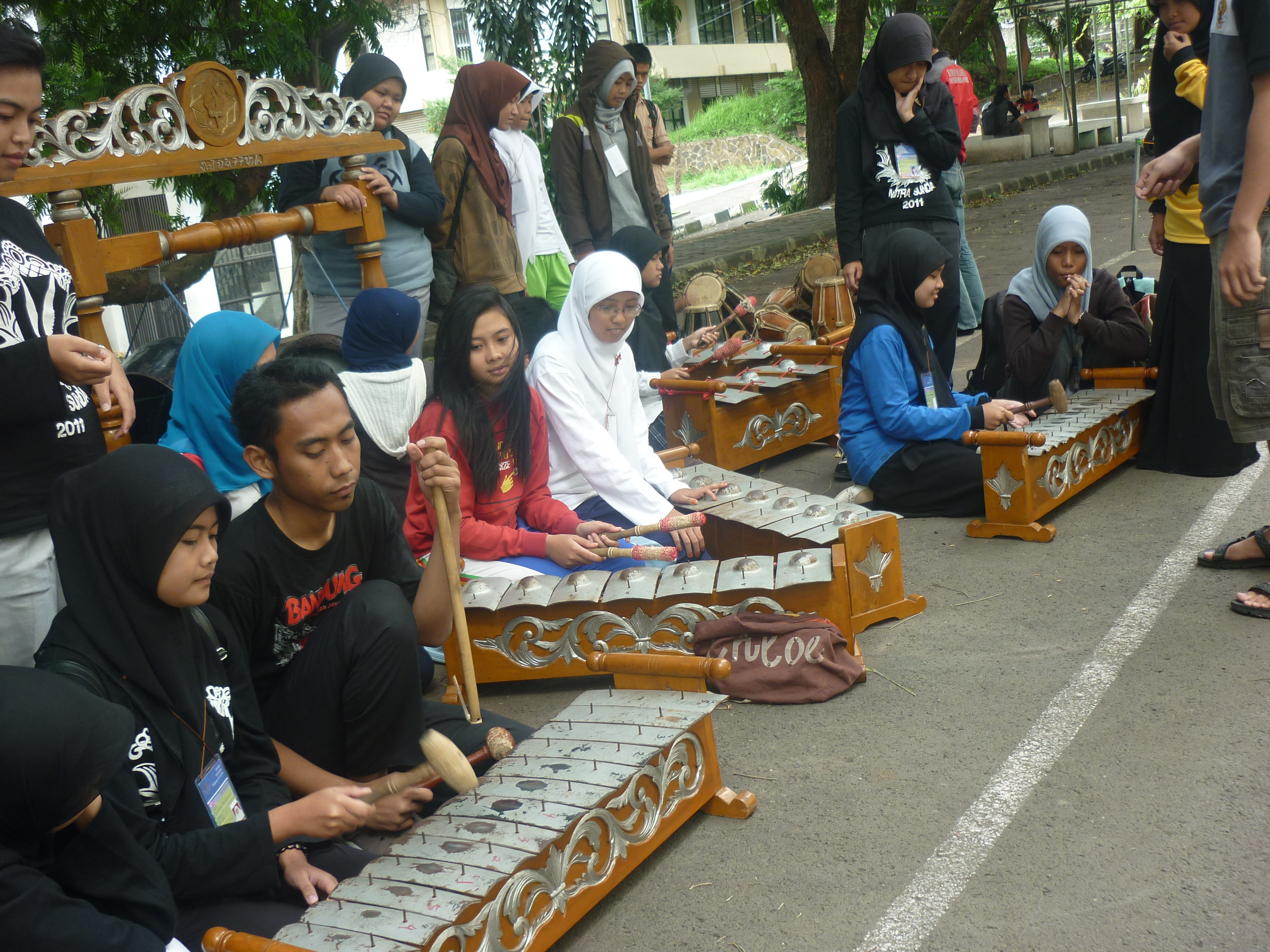
Sundanese students playing gamelan degung on the street

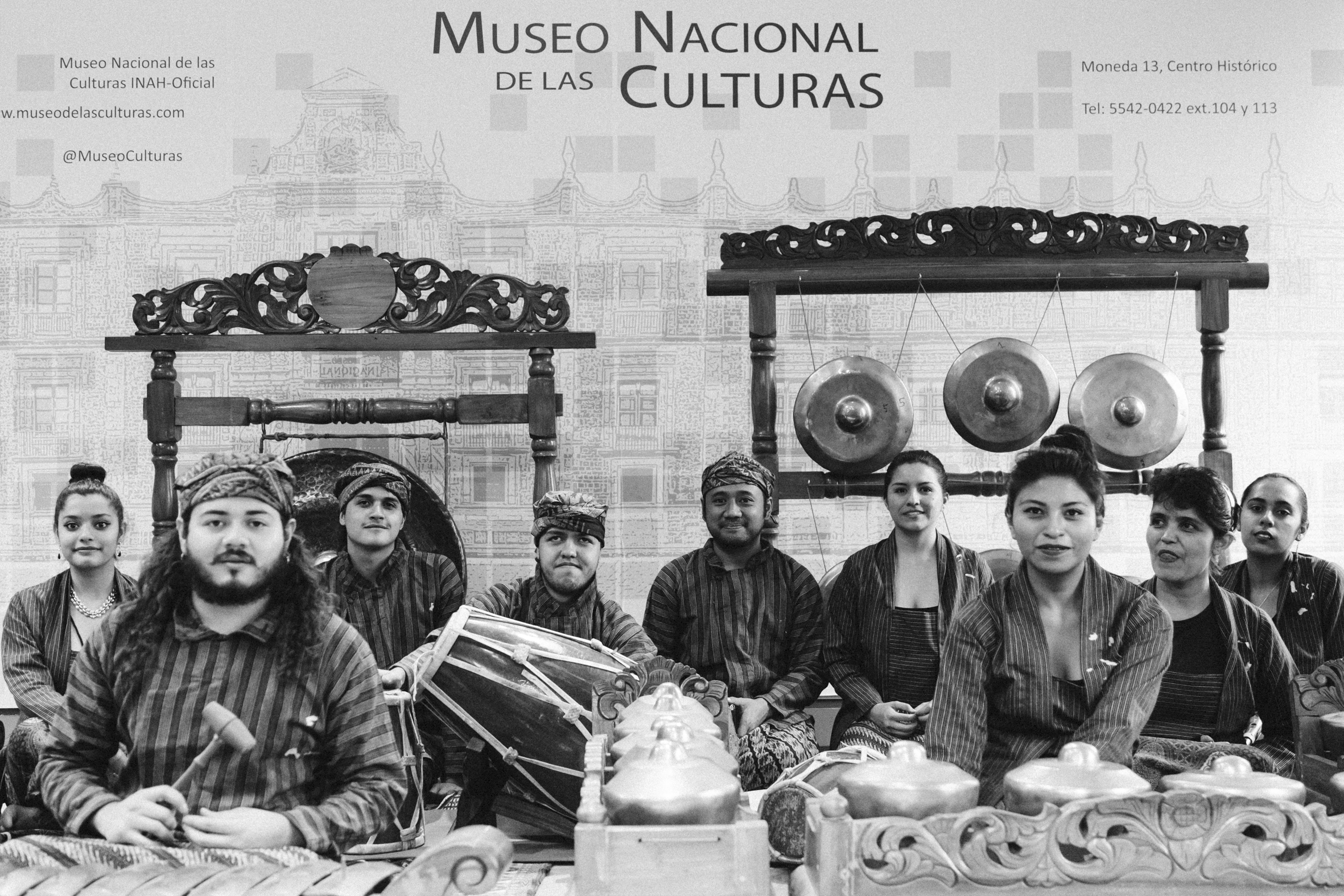
Gamelan degung performed by Indra Swara in Mexico

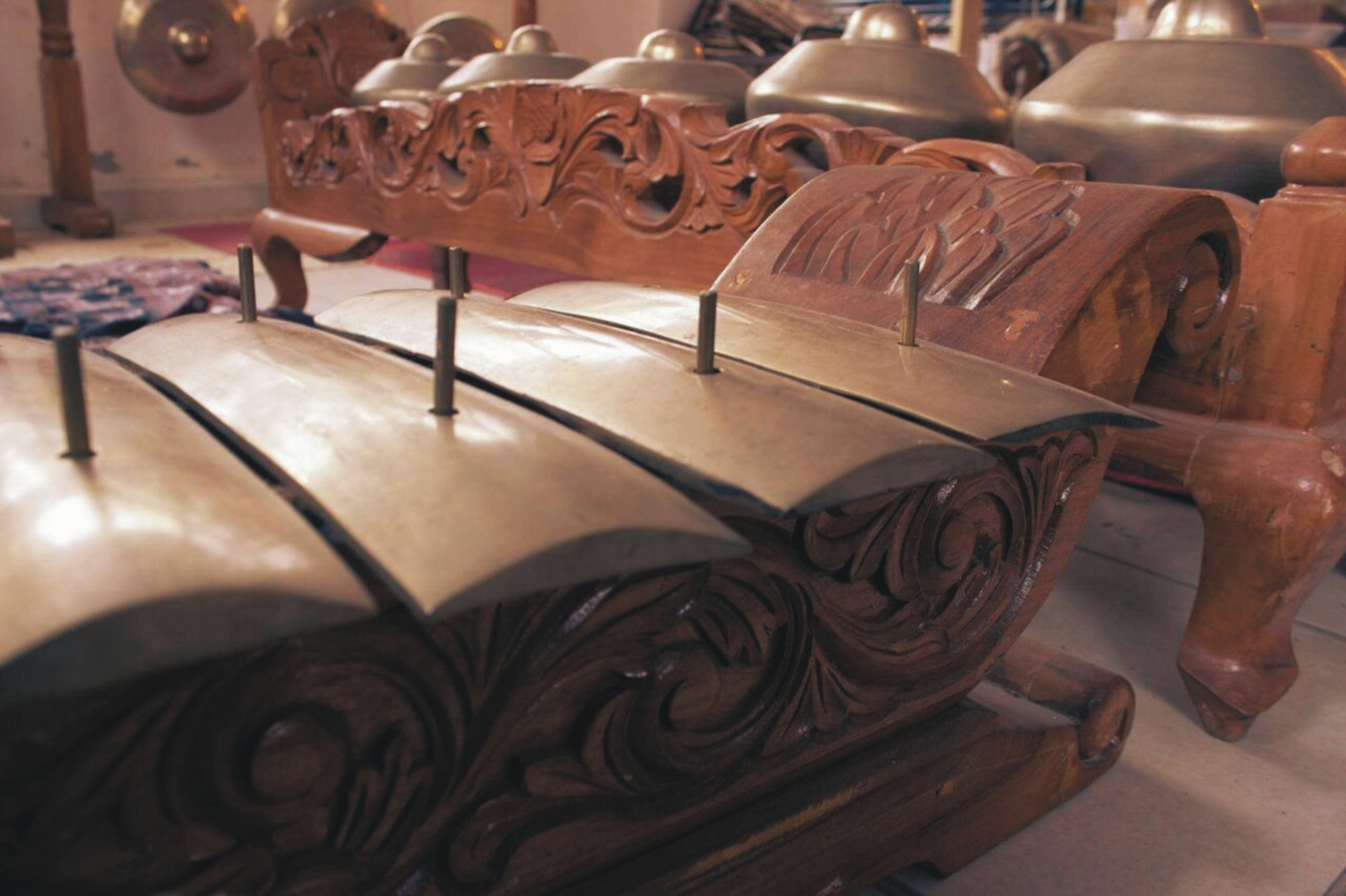
Gamelan degung instruments

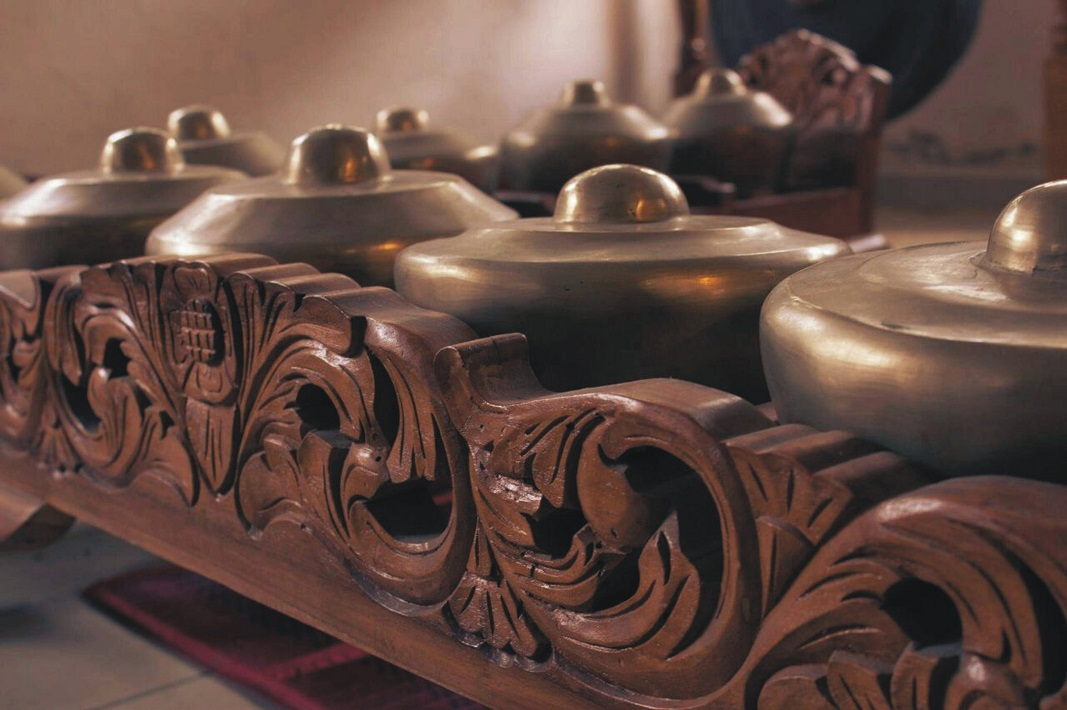
Bonang

== See also ==
- Gong gede
