= Implosions (album) =

Studio album by Stephan Micus
- Released: March 1977
- Recorded: March 1977 at Tonstudio Bauer, Ludwigsburg
- Genre: ambient rock, folk rock
- Length: 42:17
- Label: JAPO
- Producer: Manfred Eicher

Stephan Micus chronology
Archaic Concerts (1976)	Implosions (1977)	Till the End of Time (1978)

Implosions is the second album by composer Stephan Micus, released in 1977 by JAPO Records.

== Reception ==
Professional ratings
Review scores
Source	Rating
AllMusic	4.5/5 stars

The AllMusic review by Michael P. Dawson simply states, "These pieces for various ethnic instruments are all played by Micus".

== Track listing ==
All music is composed by Stephan Micus.

Side one
No.	Title	Length
1.	"As I Crossed a Bridge of Dreams"	20:52

Side two
No.	Title	Length
1.	"Borkenkind"	6:45
2.	"Amarchaj"	5:15
3.	"For the 'Beautiful Changing Child'"	3:40
4.	"For M'schr and Djingis Khan"	6:24

== Personnel ==
- Dieter Bonhorst – design
- Manfred Eicher – production
- Stephan Micus – acoustic guitar, hammer dulcimer, khlui, rabab, shakuhachi, shō, sitar, vocals, zither
- Dietmar Werle – photography
- Martin Wieland – engineering
