= Palendag =

Philippine bamboo flute

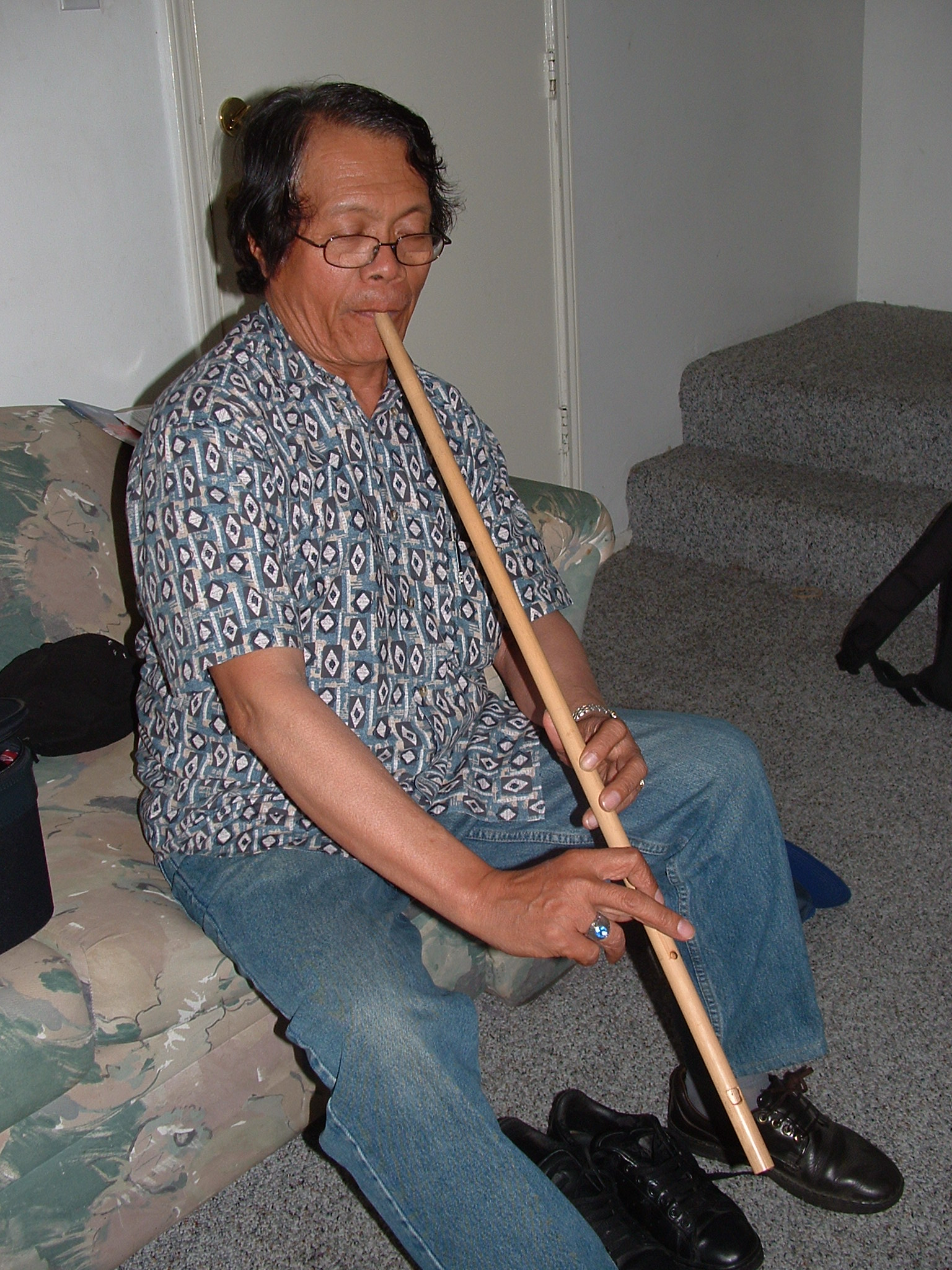
A palendag, a Philippine bamboo flute of the Maguindanaon people

The palendag, also called Pulalu (Manobo and Mansaka), Palandag (Bagobo), Pulala (Bukidnon) and Lumundeg (Banuwaen) is a type of Philippine bamboo flute, the largest one used by the Maguindanaon, a smaller type of this instrument is called the Hulakteb (Bukidnon). A lip-valley flute, it is considered the toughest of the three bamboo flutes (the others being the tumpong and the suling) to use because of the way one must shape one's lips against its tip to make a sound. The construction of the mouthpiece is such that the lower end is cut diagonally to accommodate the lower lip and the second diagonal cut is make for the blowing edge. Among the Bukidnon, a similar instrument with the same construction except that it is three-fourths the length of the palendag, is called the hulakteb

For the Maguindanaon, the palendag was used for intimate gatherings for families in the evening.
