= Suling =

Southeast Asian bamboo ring flute

Suling ᮞᮥᮜᮤᮀ
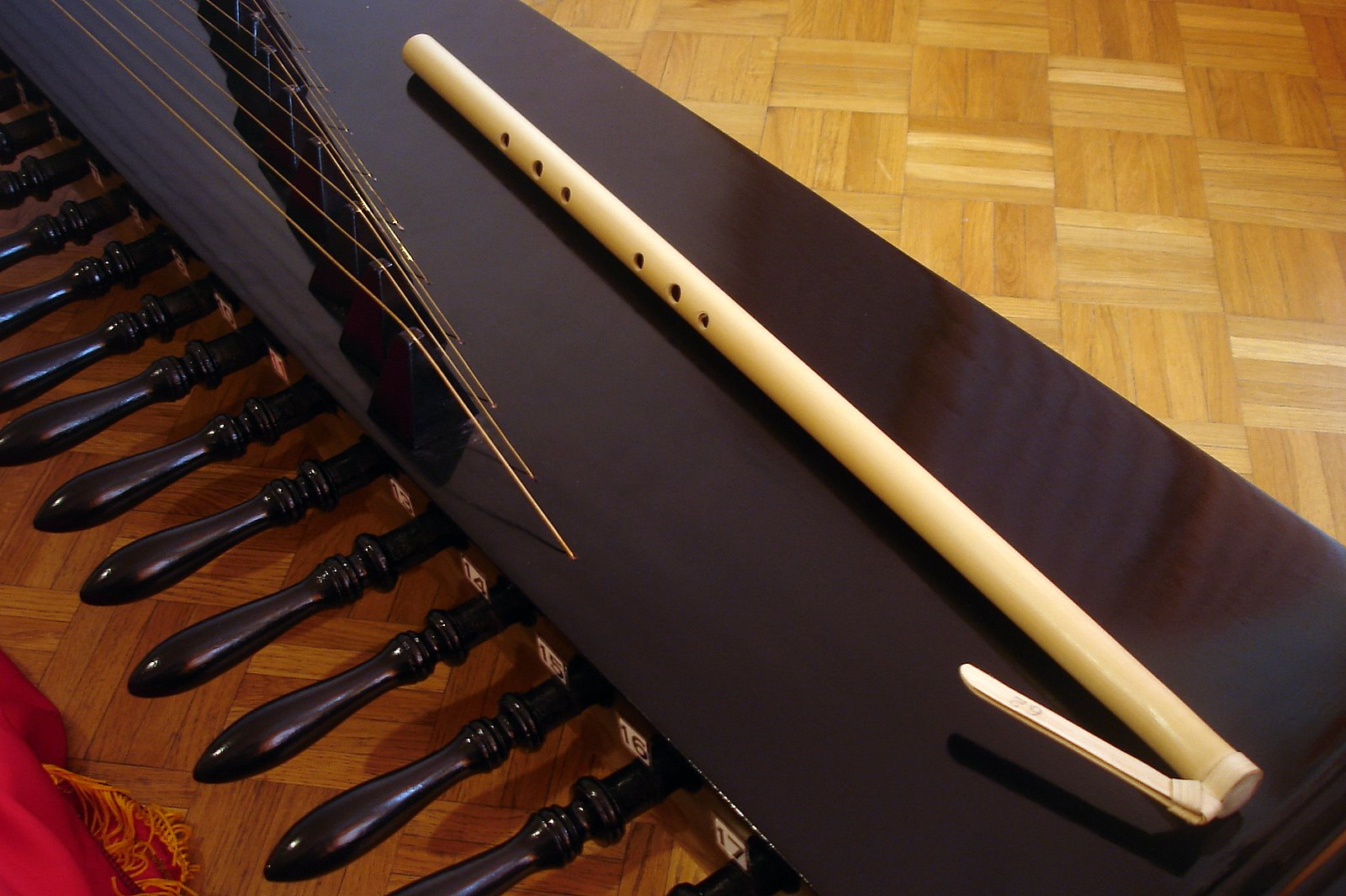
- Suling with the Kacapi

Woodwind instrument
- Inventor: Sundanese people
- Developed: Indonesia

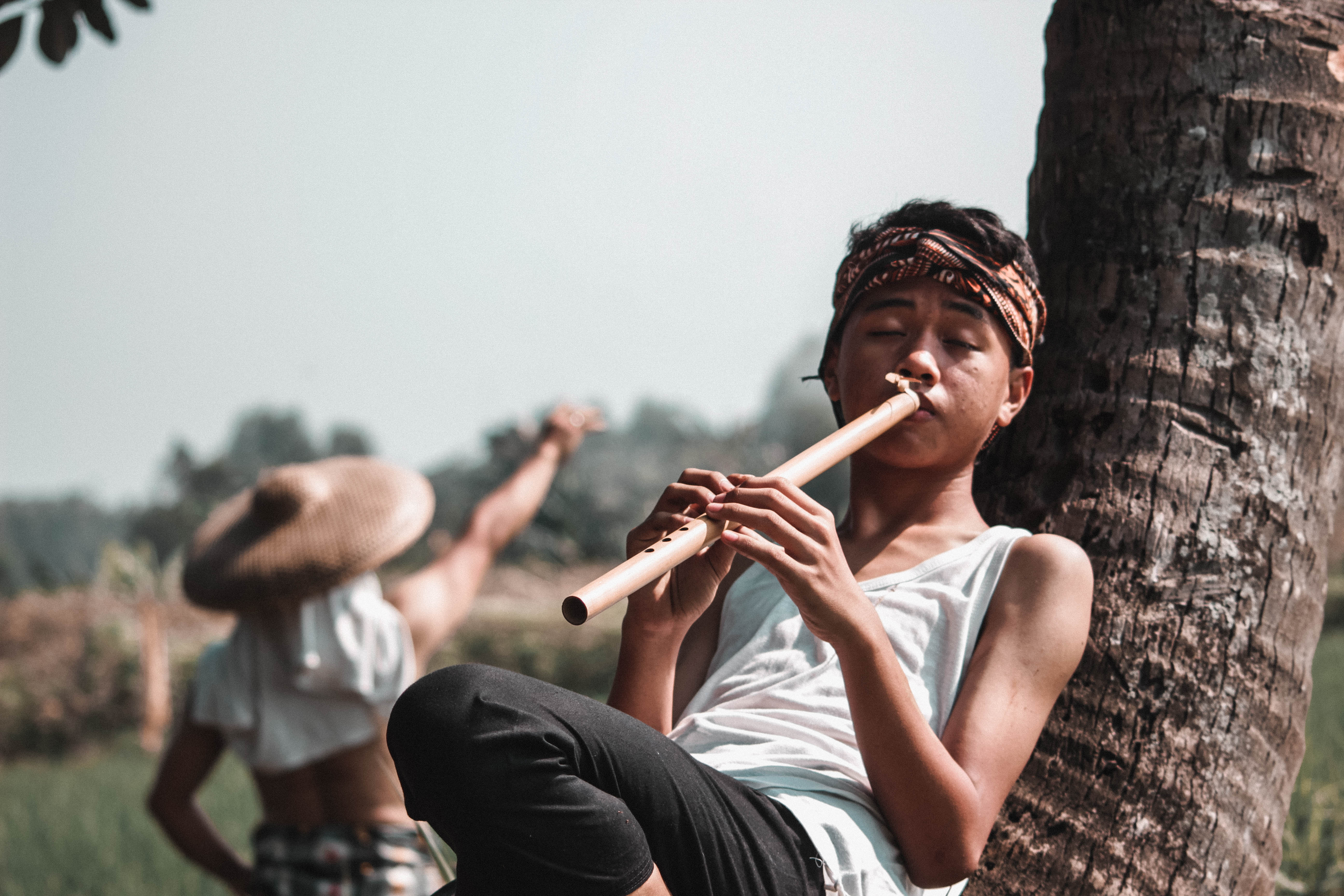
A Native Indonesian boy, playing a Sundanese suling

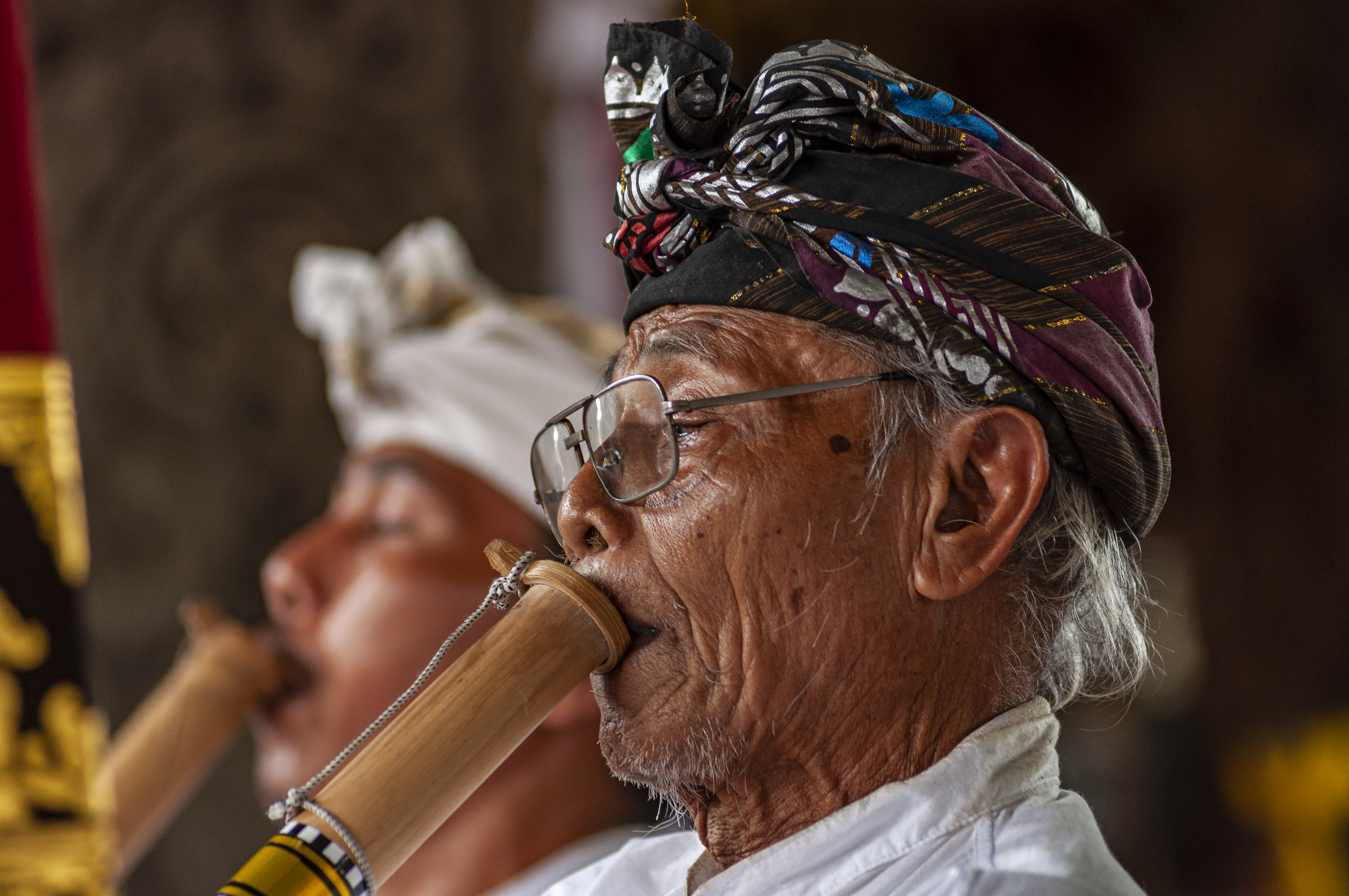
Seruling Gambuh Bali

The suling (Sundanese: ᮞᮥᮜᮤᮀ) is a musical instrument of the Sundanese people in Indonesia. It is used in the Degung ensemble. Bamboo ring flute can also be found in Southeast Asia, especially in Brunei, Indonesia, Malaysia, the Philippines and Singapore.

== Construction ==
Sulings are made mainly of tamiang bamboo (Schizostachyum blumei, Nees), a long, thin-walled bamboo tube. The mouthpiece of the suling is circled with a thin band made of rattan near a small hole.

== Playing method ==
To play the suling, performers blow into a gap between the rattan band and the bamboo tube at one end of the instrument.

There are two factors that affect a fine suling's tone:

1. Fingering position.
2. Speed of the airflow blown by the mouth. This factor also should be supported with the position of the mouth around the blowing hole.

The fingering position changes the wavelength of sound resonance inside the suling's body. Depending on the distance of nearest hole to the suling's head, different notes can be produced. The airflow speed also can modify the tone's frequency. A note with twice frequency can be produced mostly by blowing the air into suling's head's hole with twice speed.

In the music of Bali, the suling is an essential instrument and it appears to be similar to other forms of Javanese suling. The way it is played, however, sets it apart from other forms of Indonesian suling. Namely, it is necessary for the performers to use the technique circular breathing in order to create a highly strung sense of constancy that continues even at moments of dramatic climax by the percussive gamelan instruments.

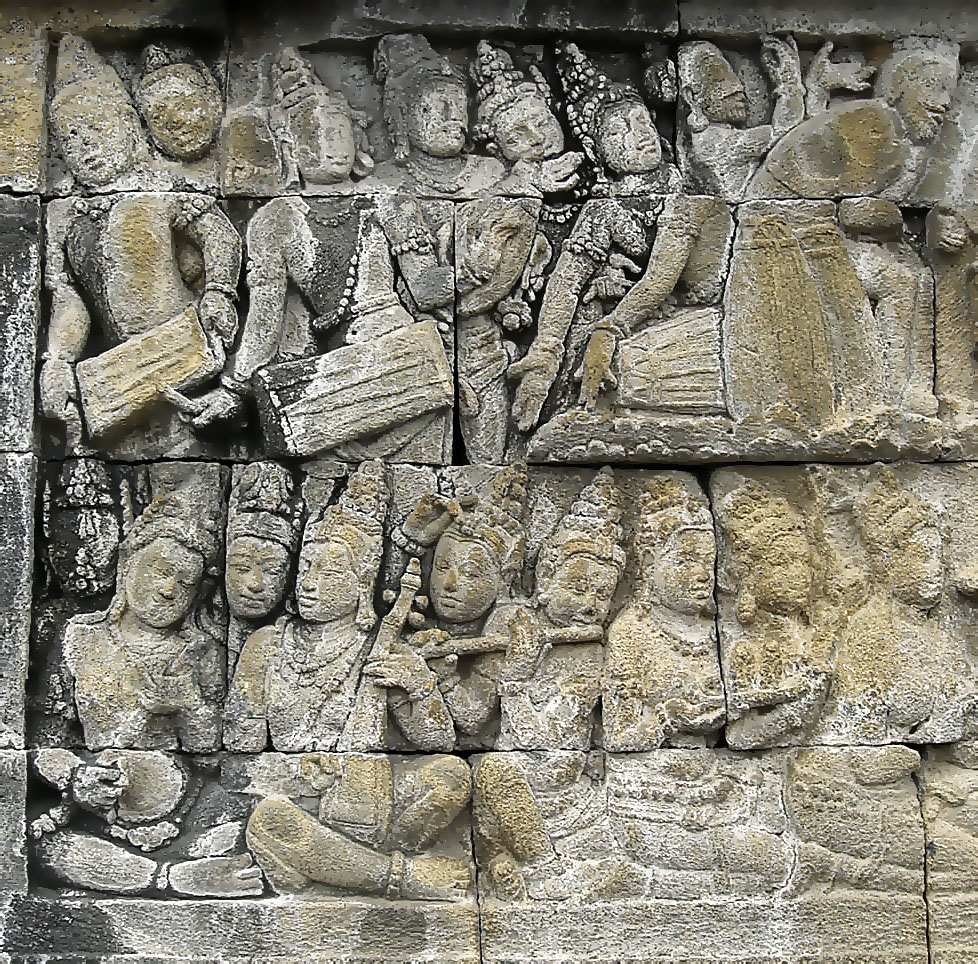
Suling players (bottom row) depicted on the 8th-century reliefs of Borobudur temple in Central Java, Indonesia

=== Special effects ===
- Slur is dynamically changing note from one tone position to another position without stopping the airflow. For example, changing from 5 to 4, 4 to 5, 2 to 1 etc.
- Puruluk (Sundanese term) is an effect produced by a-repeatedly-fast opening-and-closing of suling's hole by one or more fingers. The produced sound is similar to voice of a pigeon. The easiest puruluk can be produced by opening and closing mid-finger as shown by the following picture:

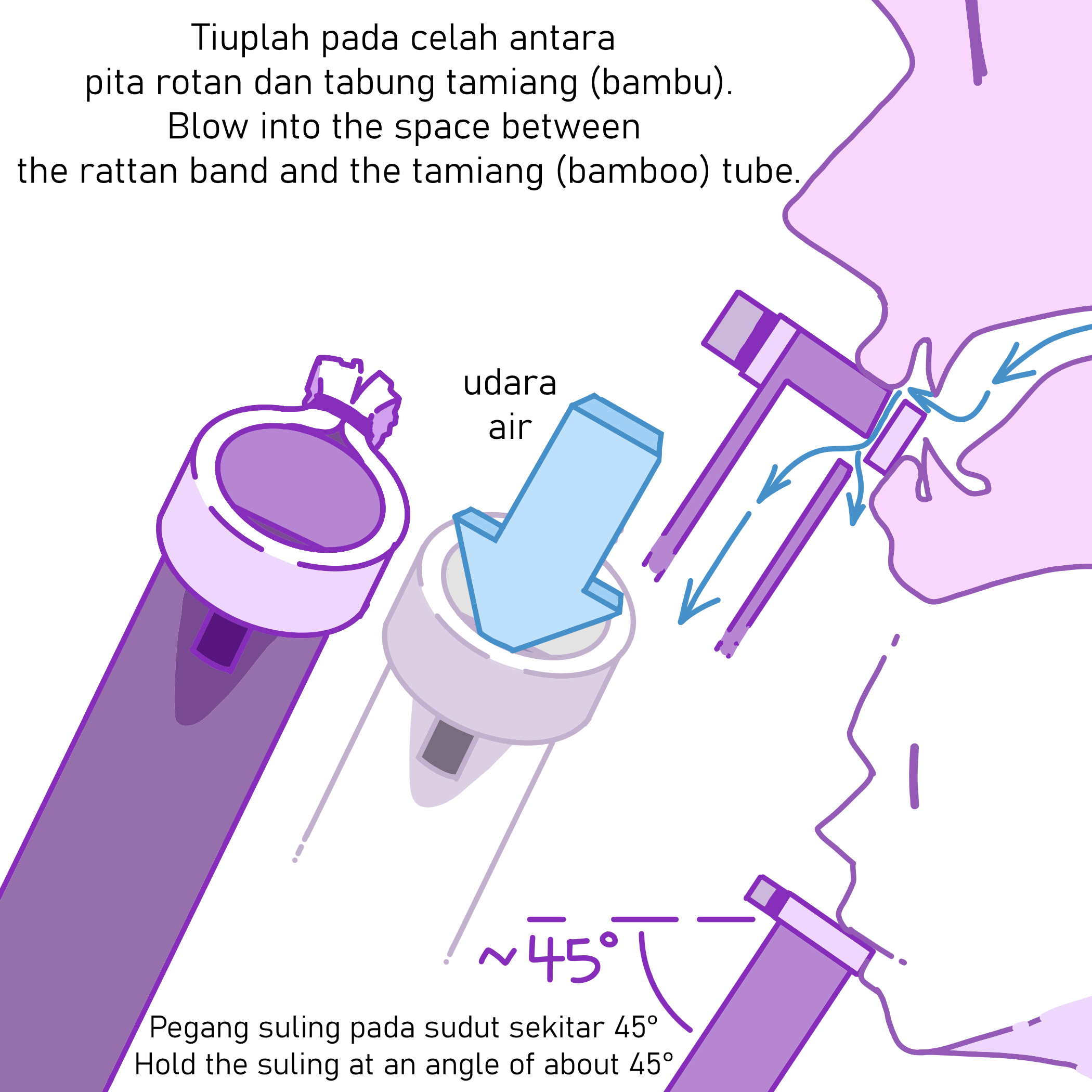
A diagram showing the technique used to play a suling

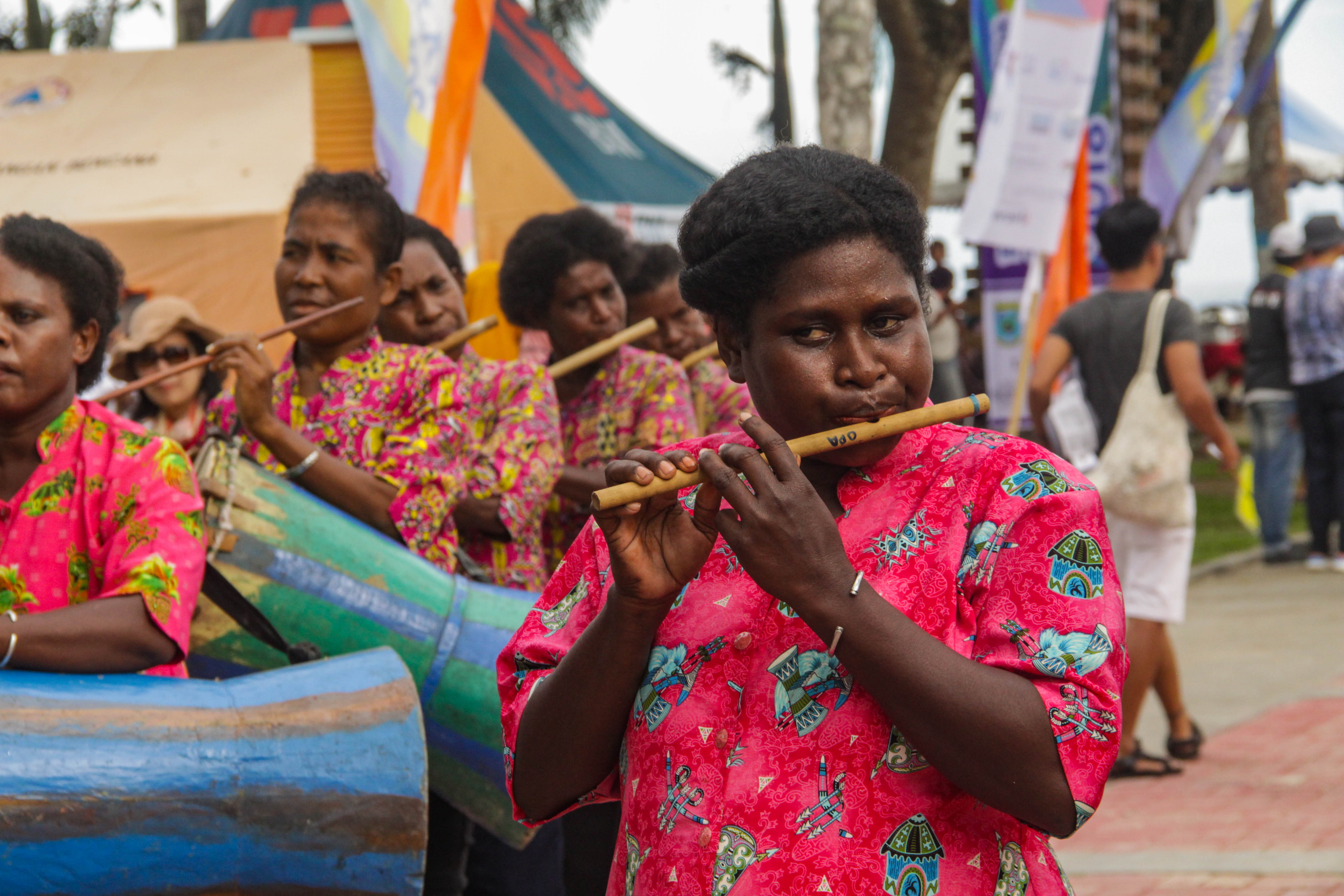
Suling, transverse bamboo flute, Papua, New Guinea. The word suling describes mostly lengthways flutes but also some transverse flutes made of bamboo.

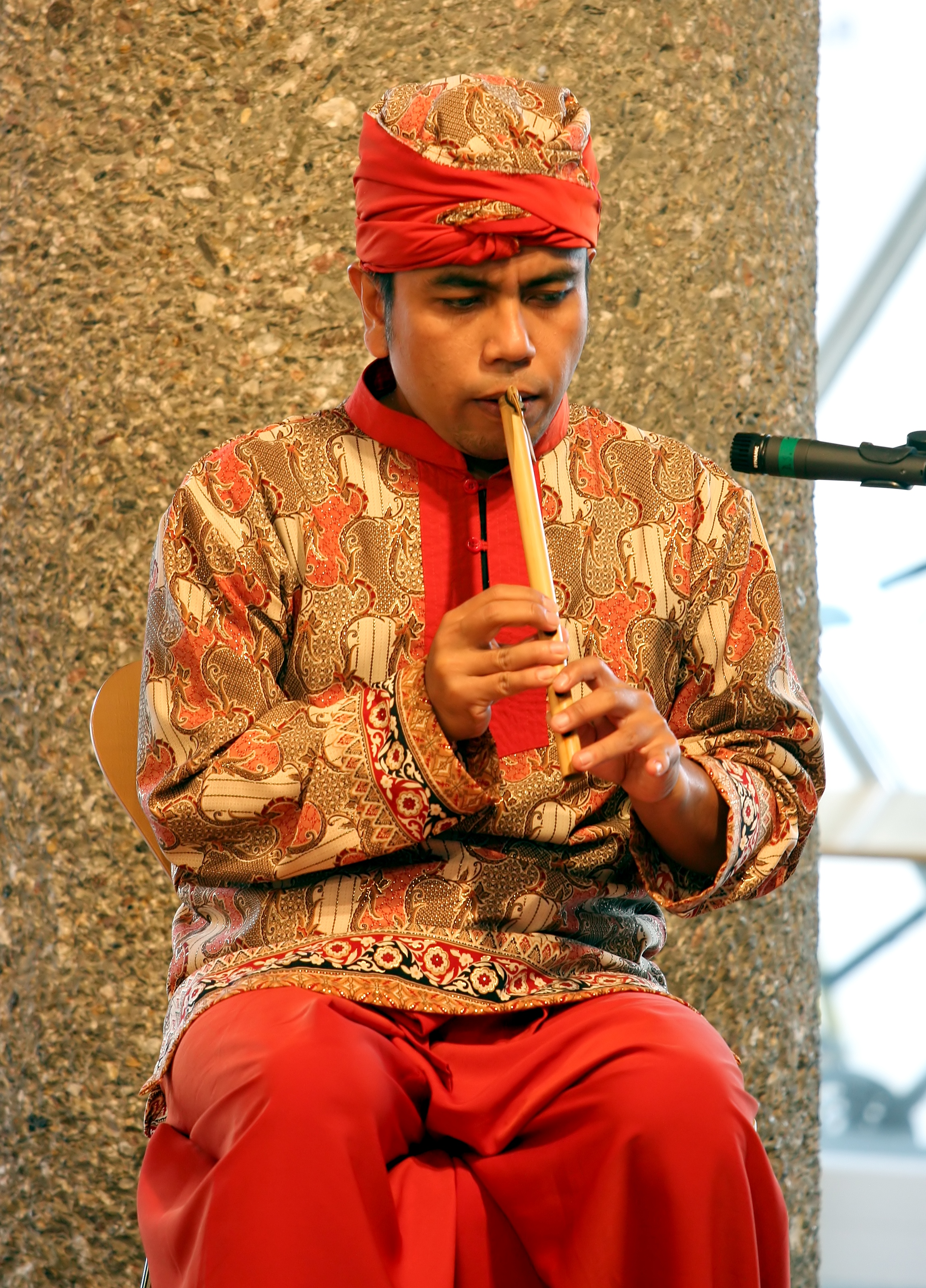
Sundanese suling performer, member of the Gamelan group SambaSunda

- In Sundanese technique, there are other known effects such as wiwiw, keleter, lelol, gebos, petit, jengkat, and betrik.

== Types ==
=== Sundanese ===
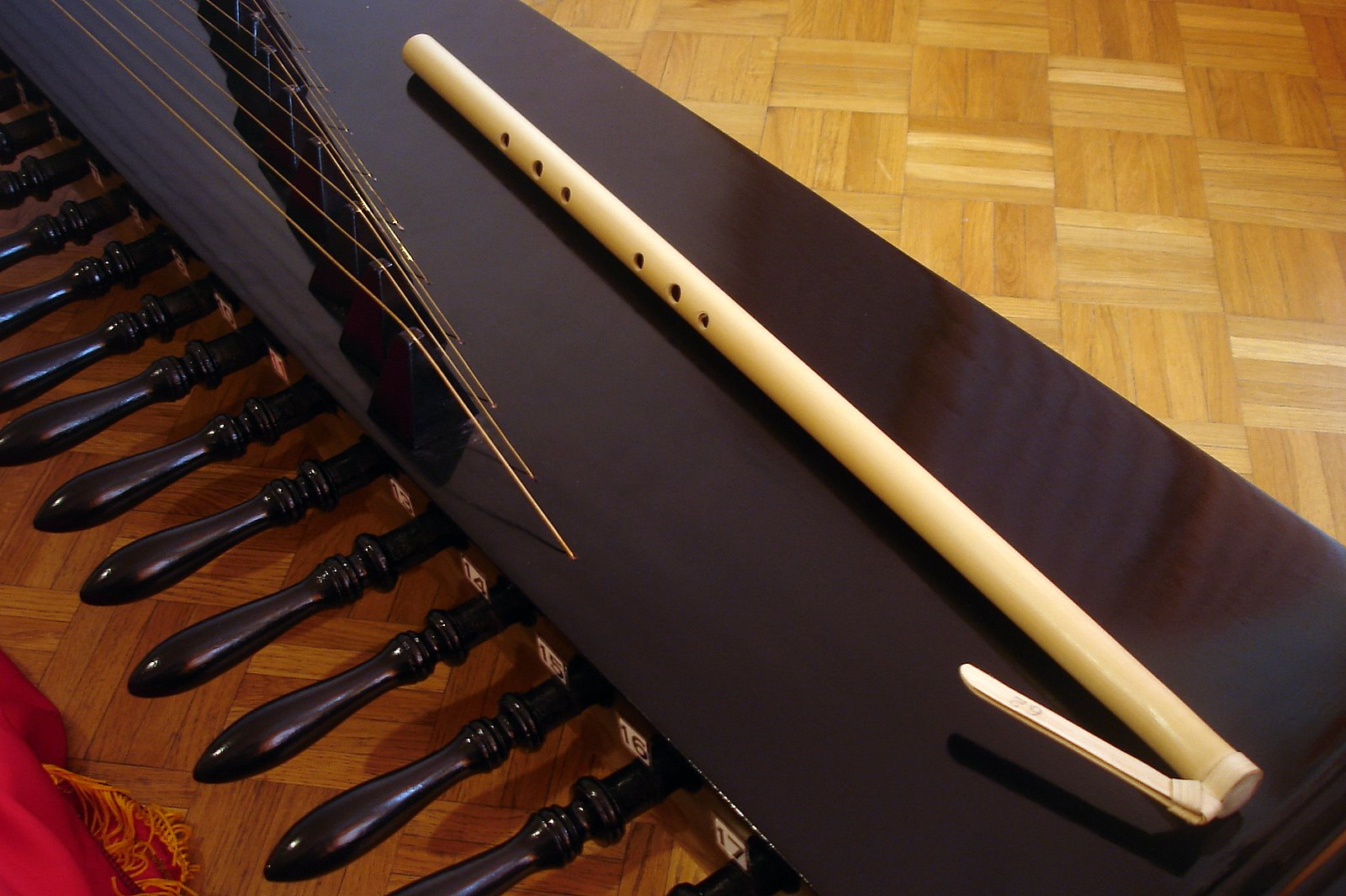
Kacapi and suling

In the Sundanese region, a suling is used as

- one of the main instruments in kacapi suling
- accompanying instrument in Gamelan Degung, Tembang Sunda

==== Tuning ====
Sulings can have either 4 holes or 6 holes. The 4-holed sulings are made for single scale usage. The 6-holed Sundanese suling can play at least three different scales. Some custom sulings have 7, 8, and 9 holes as additional holes for playing extended scales such as Mandalungan, the transposed version of Degung.

- Pelog/Degung: da mi na ti la da [1 2 3 4 5 1],
  nearly corresponds to do si sol fa mi do [1' 7 5 4 3 1] in the Western diatonic scale.
- Madenda/Sorog: da mi na ti la da [1 2 3 4 5 1], nearly similar to fa mi do si la fa [4’ 3’ 1’ 7 6 4] in the Western diatonic scale. Madenda conceptually played by changing the 3rd note of Degung [1' 7 5 4 3 1] in diatonic scale to [1' 7 6 4 3 1], and move the Sundanese 1/da to the Western 4/fa position.
- Saléndro: da mi na ti la da [1 2 3 4 5 1],
  nearly similar to re do la sol fa re [2’ 1’ 6 5 4 2] in the Western diatonic scale. Saléndro tone are almost five-equally divided tones, called as Saléndro Padantara (equal interval). Unequal division of Saléndro notes called as Saléndro Bédantara (unequal interval).
- Mandalungan: a rarely used scale, similar to Degung scale, but it is actually a transposed Degung via changing the 4th tone of Madenda [4' 3' 1' 7 6 4] in Western diatonic scale to [4' 3' 1' ♭7 6 4]. Basically sounds the same as Degung, just with a different transposition. This scale needs an extra hole (usually in the back of suling) to play.
- Wisaya: this scale is the same as Madenda/Sorog, but on different transposition. This scale is only playable with additional hole, usually on the back and top most position. Its notation [1 2 3 4 5 1] corresponds to western [1' 7 5 ♯4 3 1]. Both Mandalungan and Wisaya can be played on a single suling with at least eight holes, which two holes are placed in the back, closed with thumbs.

While playing with kacapi, the order of pieces played are usually played in this sequence (the displayed notes are in Western scale degree): Salendro [2’ 1’ 6 5 4 2], Wisaya [1' 7 5 ♯4 3 1], Degung [1' 7 5 4 3 1], Madenda [4’ 3’ 1’ 7 6 4], and then Mandalungan [4' 3' 1' ♭7 6 4]. The order makes minimal retuning the number of the kacapi strings. Saléndro is a distinct scale in this case, with the most different notes set compared the rest of the scales. From Wisaya to Mandalungan, we can notice there's only one change of note from each previous scale to the next scale: Wisaya to Degung [♯4] to [4], Degung to Madenda [5] to [6], and Madenda to Mandalungan [7] to [♭7]. Regular six holes suling can only access Saléndro, Degung, and Madenda.

The following picture shows the fingering for a six-holed Sundanese suling.
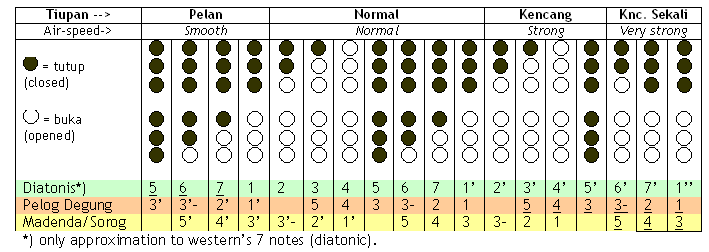

And below is the example of 'more realistic' view of finger positioning for the pelog degung scale.

==== Famous Sundanese suling players ====
- Endang Sukandar, 1996 2nd Winner of International Festival of Wind Instruments in Seoul, South Korea
- Burhan Sukarma
- Uking Sukri
- Bang Saat (Additional player of Dewa Budjana, He came from kalimantan) He also called as "saat"

The Suling can be in many sizes. Sundanese traditional suling are sold in based on tunings which usually determined from each size label such as 54, 56, 60, etc. Suling 56 means that the length of the suling corresponds to roughly 56 cm, and usually tuned to 1/da=G, which resulting Degung scale have this collection of notes: G F♯ D C B.

== Suling outside Indonesia ==
In Brunei, the suling today is played during a cultural festival and other events together with other Bruneian traditional instruments especially the Gulintangan. While in East Malaysia, especially in Sabah with a wide variety of aerophone, the instrument is played by all the interior ethnic groups in the state of Kadazan-Dusun, Murut, Rungus and Lun Bawang/Lundayeh. In Sarawak, the suling is mostly played by men in a Dayak people longhouse.

It is also called as suling by the Tausug, Yakan, B'laan, and Tiruray. Other names for the suling include the lantey (Ata), kinsi (Bukidnon), dagoyong (Higanon) and a babarak (Palawan)

The Maguindanaon suling is the smallest bamboo flute of the Maguindanaon and the only one classified as a ring-flute (the other two bamboo flutes of the Maguindanaon, the tumpong and the palendag are both lip-valley flutes). Air is passed through the suling via a blowing hole found at the bottom of the instrument and pitch is controlled via five finger holes on the top and one finger hole located on the bottom. Traditionally only the palendag was commonly played but because of the difficult nature of playing the palendag, both the tumpong and the suling have come to replace the palendag as the Maguindanaon's most common aerophones.

== See also ==
- Bamboo musical instruments
- Sundanese music
