= Tumpong =

Philippine bamboo flute

A tumpong, a Philippine bamboo flute of the Maguindanaon people

The tumpong (also inci among the Maranao) is a type of Philippine bamboo flute used by the Maguindanaon, half the size of the largest bamboo flute, the palendag. A lip-valley flute like the palendag, the tumpong makes a sound when players blow through a bamboo reed placed on top of the instrument and the air stream produced is passed over an airhole atop the instrument. This masculine instrument is usually played during family gatherings in the evening and is the most common flute played by the Maguindanaon.

== Images ==
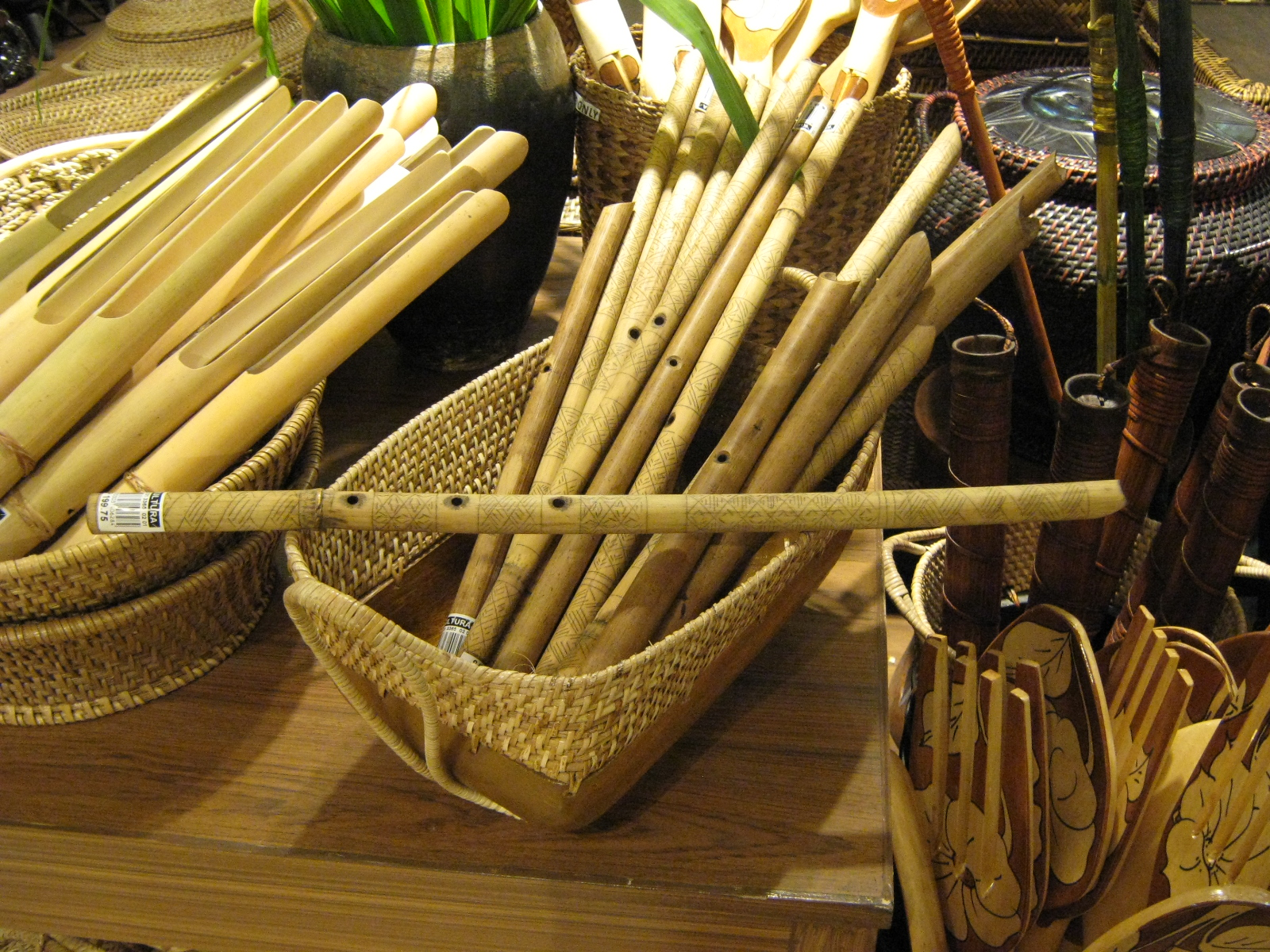
Philippines bamboo flute

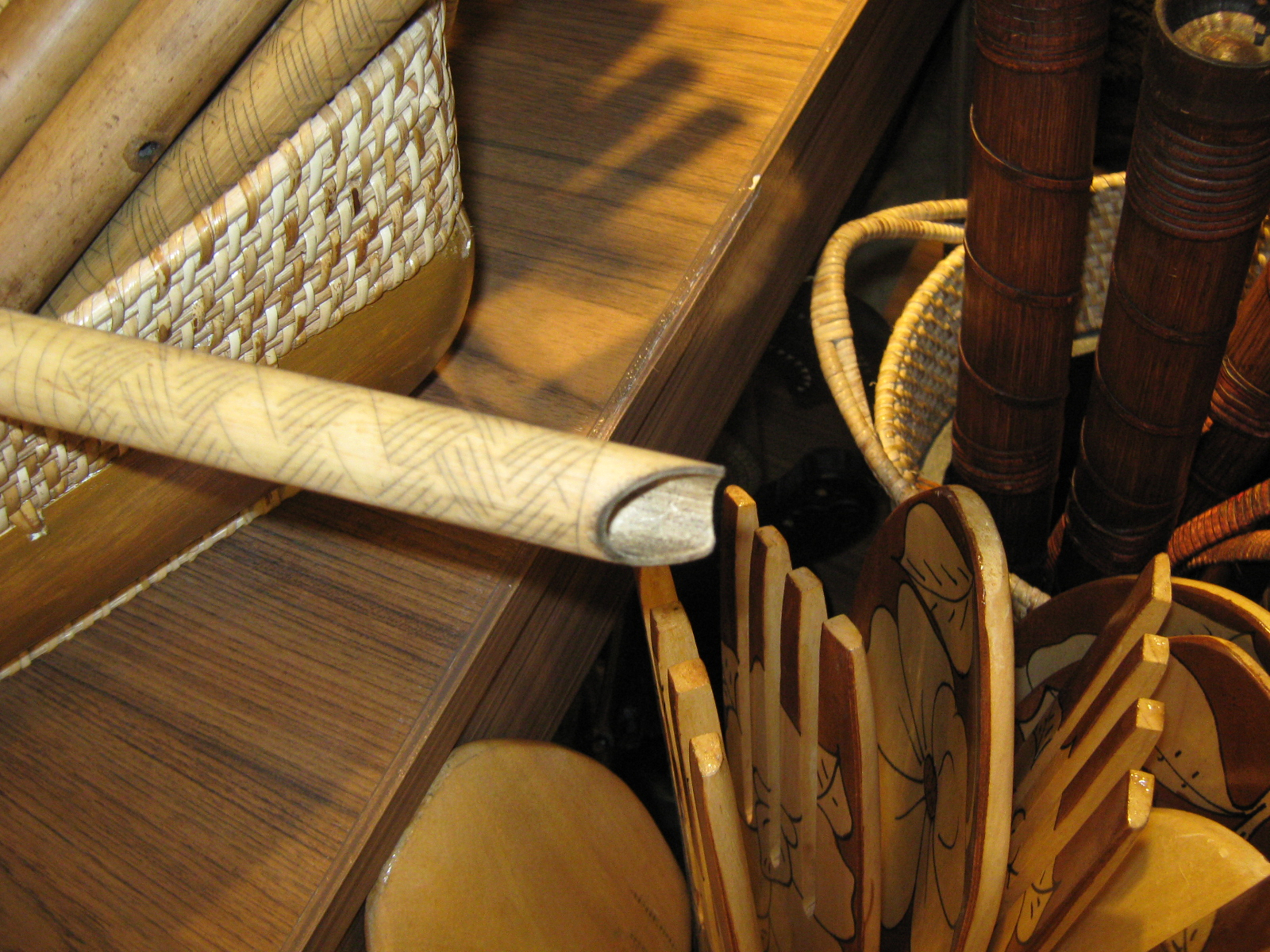
Philippines bamboo flute

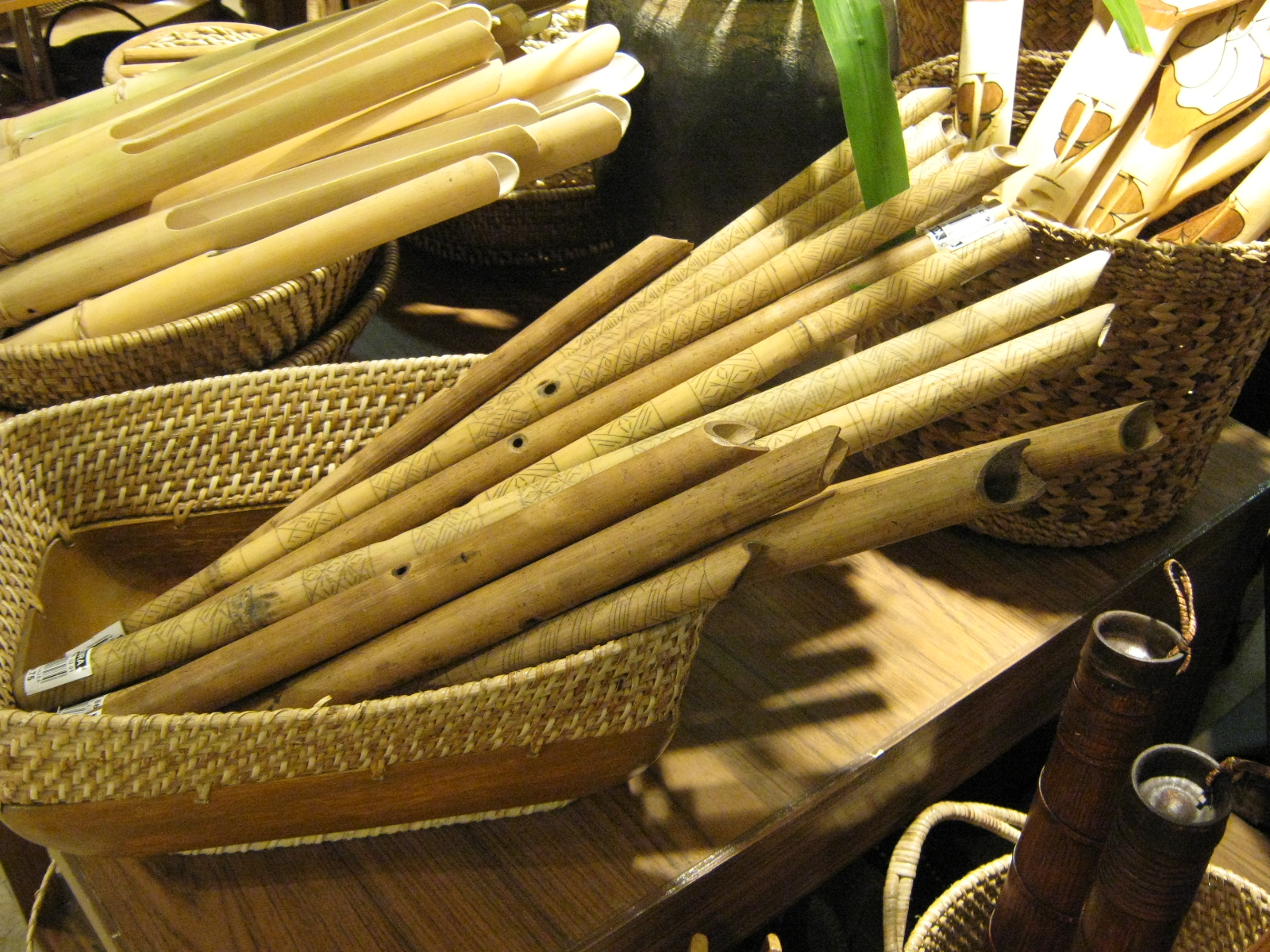
Philippines bamboo flute
