= Kacapi =

Indonesian traditional musical instrument

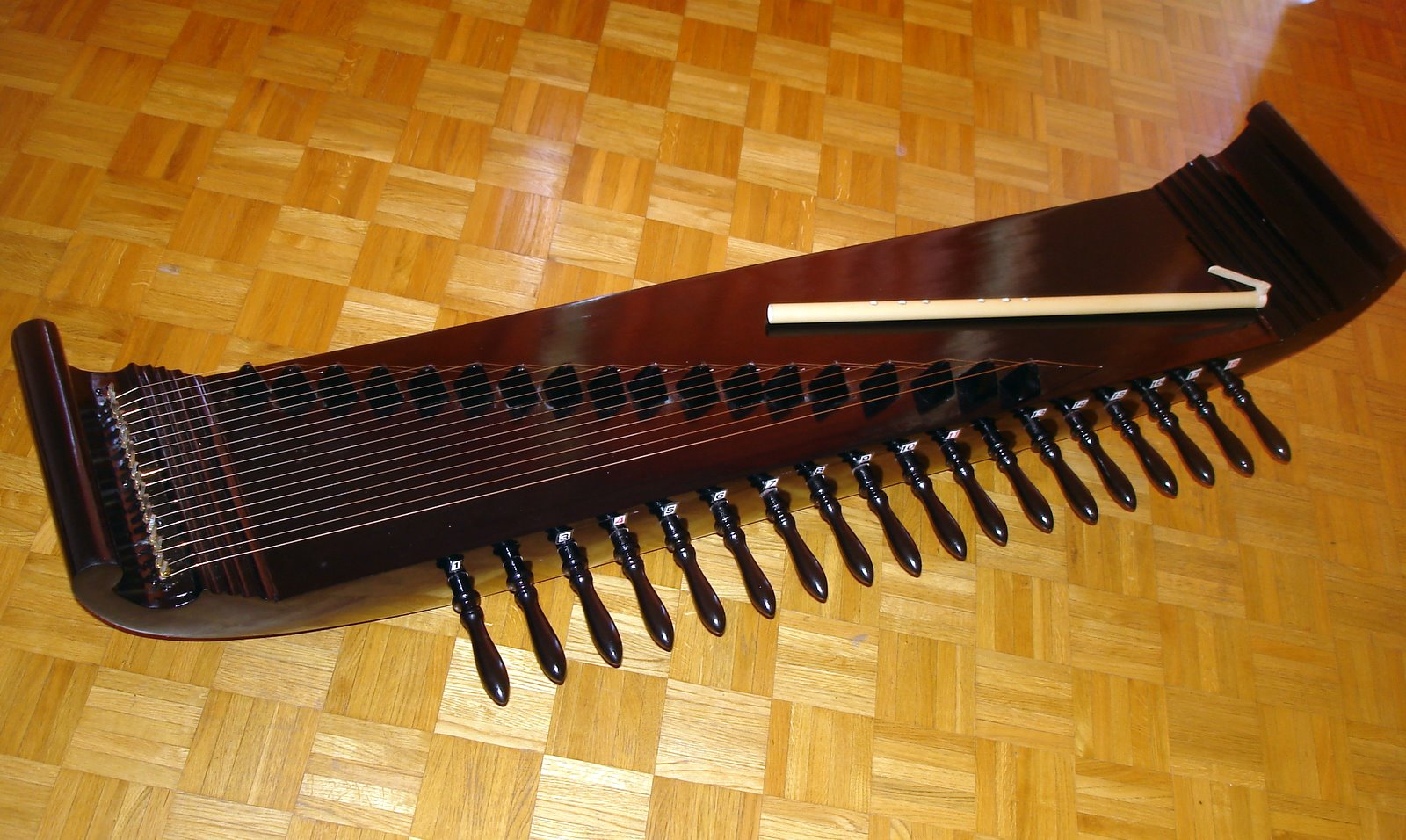
- Kacapi indung or kacapi parahu, with 18 strings.
- Classification: String instrument
- Developed: Indonesia

The kacapi is a traditional zither of Sundanese people in Indonesia. This musical instrument is similar to Chinese guzheng, Japanese koto, the Mongolian yatga, the Korean gayageum, the Vietnamese đàn tranh and the Kazakh jetigen. The kacapi played as the main accompanying instrument in the tembang Sunda or Mamaos Cianjuran, kacapi suling (tembang Sunda without vocal accompaniment) genre (called kecapi seruling in Indonesian), pantun stories recitation or an additional instrument in gamelan degung performance.

The word kacapi in Sundanese also refers to santol tree, from which initially the wood is believed to be used for building the zither instrument.

== Form ==
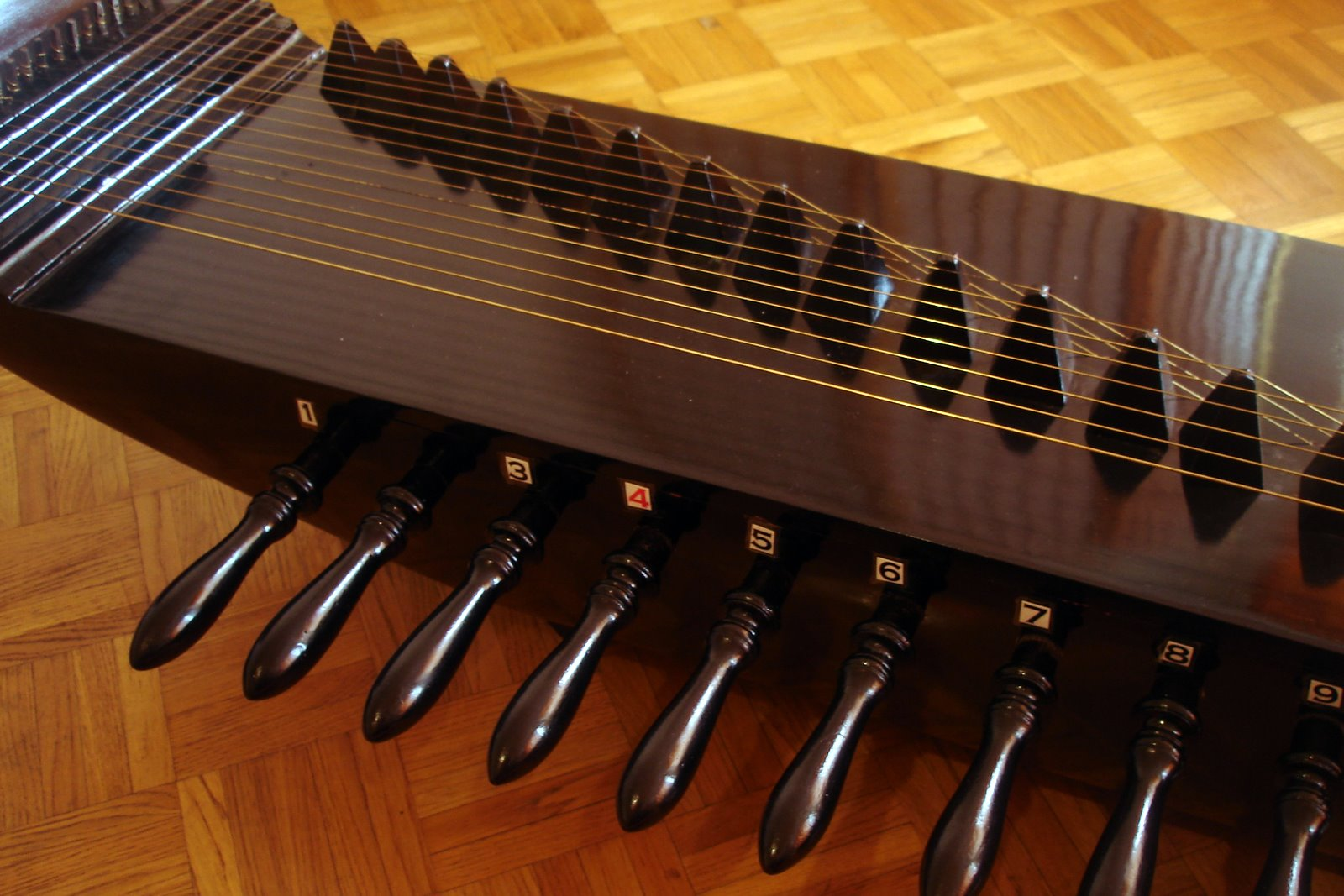
Details of tuner elements of a kacapi parahu

According to its form or physical appearance, there are two kinds of kacapi:

The kacapi parahu (literally "boat kacapi), also called kacapi gelung, is a resonance box with an uncovered underside to allow the sound out. The sides of this kind of kacapi are tapered inward from top to bottom, which gives the instrument a boat-like shape. In ancient times, it was made directly from solid wood by perforating it.

The kacapi siter (literally "zither kacapi) is a plan-parallel resonance box. Similar to the kacapi parahu, its hole is located at the bottom. The upper and bottom sides of it form a trapezoid shape.

For both kinds of kacapi, each string is affixed to a small screw or peg on the top right-hand side of the box. They can be tuned in different systems: pelog, sorog/madenda, or slendro. Kacapi siter often tuned in Western diatonic scale for some purposes, such as contemporary music.

Nowadays, the resonance box of kacapi is made by gluing six wood-plates side by side.

The kacapi is traditionally played by sitting cross-legged on the floor. Thus, the strings are about 25 cm above the floor. Nowadays the kacapi is sometimes placed on a wooden frame, so that the player can sit on a chair. If the kacapi indung is played while sitting on the floor, usually a pillow or some other small object is placed under its left-hand side, as seen from the player, so that the sound can freely escape through the resonance hole in the bottom of the soundbox. Some kecapi are fitted with small feet, so that it is not necessary to lift them in this way.

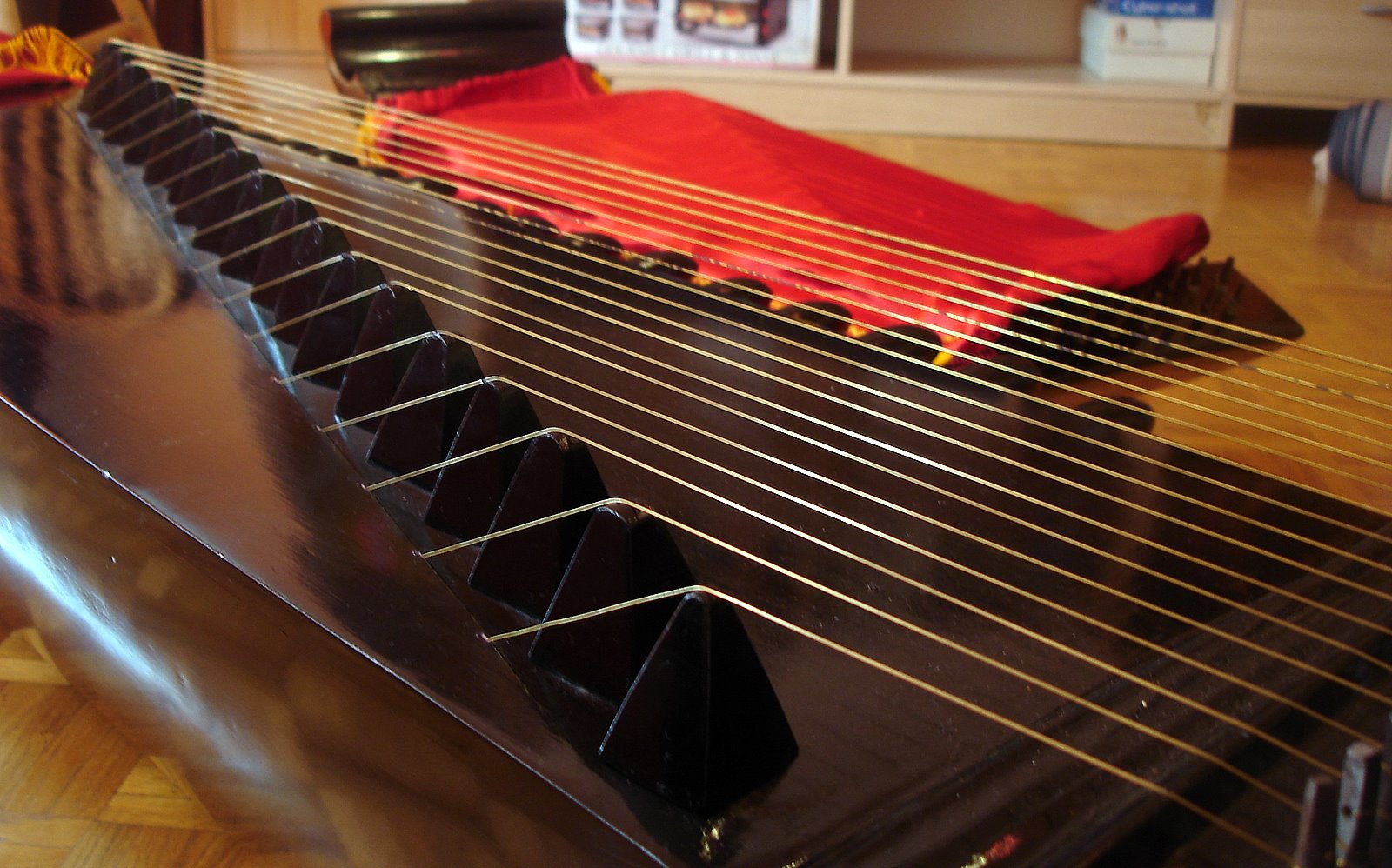
Details of pawn-bridges of a kacapi parahu

== Functions ==
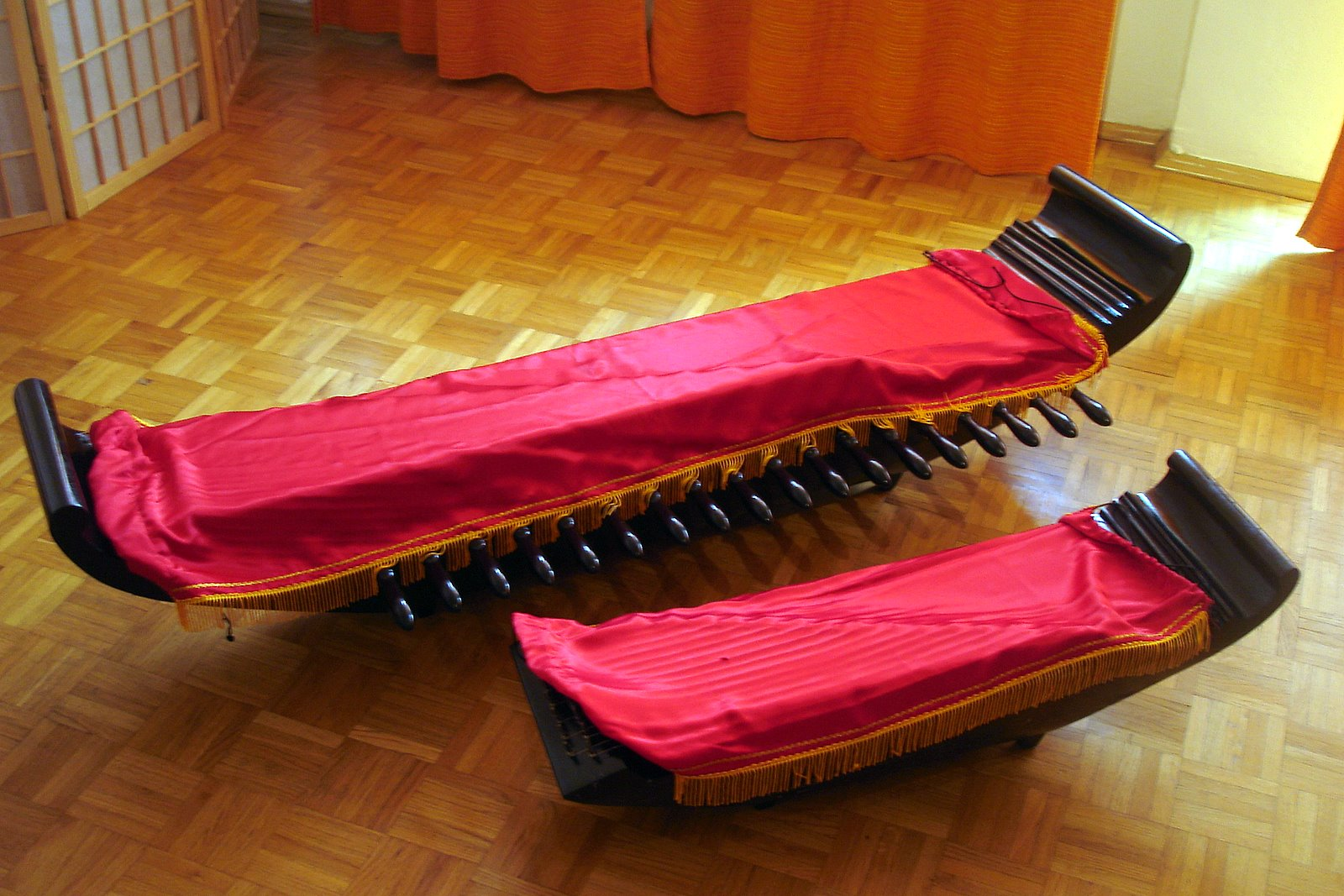
Kacapi indung and kacapi rincik

According to its functions in a musical accompaniment, the kacapi is played as:

1. Kacapi Indung (=mother kacapi) or ; and
2. Kacapi Anak (=child kacapi) or Kacapi Rincik

The Kacapi indung leads the accompaniment by providing intros, bridges, and interludes, as well as determining the tempo. For this purpose, a large kacapi with 18 or 20 strings is used.

The Kacapi rincik enriches the accompaniment by filling in inter-note spaces with higher frequencies, especially in fixed metered songs as in the kacapi suling or Sekar Panambih. For this purpose, a smaller kacapi with ~15 strings is used.

== Tuning and notation ==
Kacapi uses various scales, such as Saléndro, Degung, Madenda, and its derived transpositions. Wisaya nad Mandalungan are playable if the suling has additional holes. See the following table.

Tunings					Western Approximations		
Saléndro	Wisaya	Degung	Madenda	Mandalungan	Suling 54	Suling 56	Suling 60
1 (da)	1 (da)	1 (da)	3 (na)	3 (na)	A♭	G	F♯
	2 (mi)	2 (mi)	4 (ti)		G	F♯	E♯ (F)
				4 (ti)	G♭	F	E
2 (mi)			5 (la)	5 (la)	F	E	D♯
3 (na)	3 (na)	3 (na)			E♭	D	C♯
	4 (ti)				D	C♯	B♯ (C)
4 (ti)		4 (ti)	1 (da)	1 (da)	D♭	C	B
	5 (la)	5 (la)	2 (mi)	2 (mi)	C	B	A♯
5 (la)					B♭	A	G♯

The note range, from the lowest to the highest frequency in Degung scale is:

The kacapi is tuned to match the 60 cm length suling tones. With this length, an approximation for the tuning compared to western scale is:

The following picture applies the above-mentioned tuning and notation.

== Recitation of pantun stories ==
It is not certain how long the kacapi has been used to accompany the recitation of pantun stories. In the Sundanese dictionary published by the Lembaga Basa & Sastra Sunda (1976) the primary meaning of the word pantun is given as kacapi. This may be an indication that the relation between the kacapi and the recitation of pantun stories is an old one. Eringa (1949:3) points to the proverb "kawas pantun teu jeung kacapi", 'like a pantun (traditional sung story telling) without a kacapi', used of someone who likes to give other people advice but who does not himself practise what he preaches. This proverb, according to Eringa, indicates that the kacapi is the Standard instrument for accompanying a pantun recitation. The Baduy Sundanese of Banten Province still make exclusive use of the kacapi to accompany their pantun stories.
