= Mohamad Fityan =

Syrian musician and composer (born 1984)

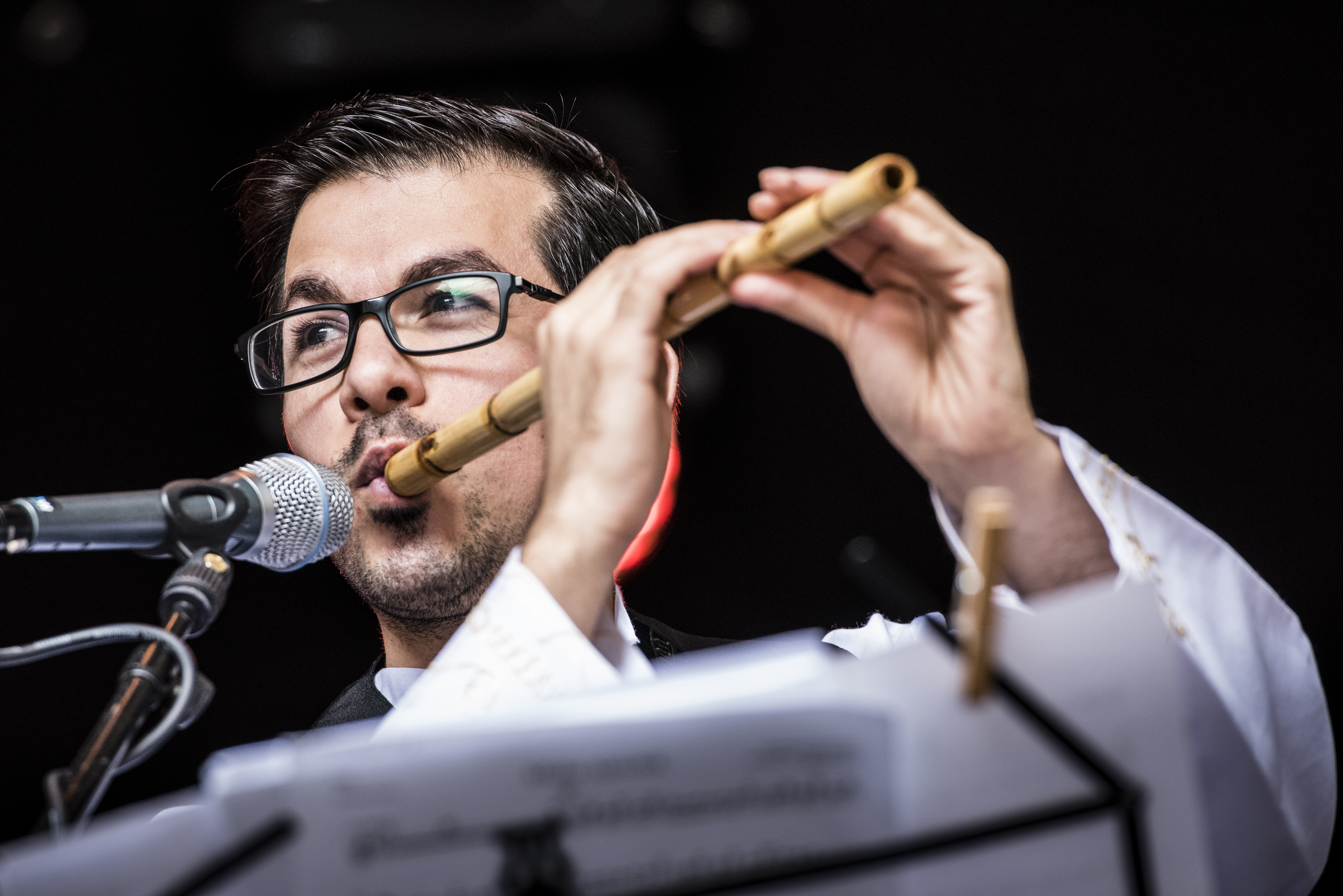

Background information
- Born: August 1, 1984 (age 41); Aleppo, Syria
- Occupations: Musician, composer
- Instruments: Ney, kawala
- Years active: 2000-present
- Website: www.fityan-music.com

Mohamad Fityan (born 1 August 1984, Aleppo, Syria) is a Syrian musician and composer known for his mastery of the ney and kawala.

Fityan studied under Mohamad Kassas and Berj Kassis. He has performed with the Syrian Orchestra and Syrian Jazz Band since 2003, and has been performing solo concerts since 2005. He received his diploma from the Higher Institute of Music in Damascus in 2010. In 2009, he founded his own band, named Ara-Sham.

Fityan teaches ney and kawala at various institutes across Syria, including the Solhi al-Wadi Institute for Music, the Syrian-Dutch “Music in Me” project supported by UNRWA since 2003, the Al-Assad Youth Institute since 2004, and the UNICEF SOS Village (2007–2009).

== Compositions ==
- Theatrical music for “Antigun Immigration” play directed by Jihad Saad (former Director of the Theaters and Music Directorate), and staged in Syria and at international festivals in Egypt, Spain, Tunisia and Pakistan (2004)
- Music for Orchard Cherries (2005) and As You Like (2006) plays directed by Ajaj Saleem (Dean of the Higher Institute of Theatrical Arts)
- Flamenco and Syrian music project with the French musician Jeremie Sieffert at the Opera House (Damascus 2006)
- Children orchestra, Solhi al-Wadi Institute (2007–2012)
- Music for the From Here to There, a play performed at the opening ceremony of the Youth Theatrical Festival (Damascus 2007)
- CD for children songs (2009)
- First musician to arrange ancient Ugarit and Phoenician music which was found on pottery tablets in Ras Shamra dated back to the first millennium B.C. It is the oldest Syrian music still now available and 2 more tracks for old Syrian Music (2009) professional recording by (Arasham-Band 2009)
- Syrian Radio Station “Arabesque” (2010)
- Tow Single Pop Songs for different Singers (2008–2013)
- New album, Soul of the Nay(2014), (Publishing at 2015);

== Concerts ==
- Concerts with Arab singers stars since (2003–2012)
- Silk Road Festival in Aleppo Castle with Japanese Traditional Instruments Band (2002)
- Solo Ney concert with the Spanish Mondo Band in Girona (2005)
- Concerts with the Syrian Symphony Orchestra and Syrian Jazz Big Band (2007)
- Ney solo with Rodrigo, classical guitar orchestra Damascus Opera (2007)
- Solo ney and kawala player at International Festival Tunis (2008)
- Syrian Jazz Big Band in Damascus solo in Opining the Festival Since (2005–2010)
- Syrian Circus School project with Syrian and Danish musicians Damascus (2009)
- John's Gospel, 5 concerts with the French Mediterranean Orchestra Fez Festival of sacred music: Marseille Opera, Nice Opera, Damascus Opera Composition: Abed Azrié (2009)
- The Epic of Gilgamesh, Composition: Abed Azrié tour in France and Germany (2010)
- Doha Capital of Arab Culture Festival Qatar (2010)
- Orchestra of the Higher Institute of Music in cooperation with the Austria Association for Contemporary Art & Music Damascus (2010)
- Tamas Project Tour Germany Cologne- Kassel, Düsseldorf and Mannheim(2010)
- Arab World Institute, 5 concerts with Paris musicians, Damascus (2009–2010)
- Fanfareduloup Orchestra Switzerland Geneva (2011)
- Artists Festival Junger Kunstler Bayreuth Germany August (2013–2014)
- Soloist with Saraband German Band since (2014)

== Recordings ==
- Syrian T.V Drama series in Syria since (2004–2012)
- Armenhagop, Armenian Symphony Orchestra Composition: Berj Kassis Syria (2004)
- John's Gospel, Composition: Abed Azrié, 2 CD's + DVD Syria-France(2009)
- Ney and jazz guitar project: 3 tracks on a promotional CD with French guitarist Cedric Molino, Syria (2009)
- Ara-Sham Band: 3 tracks for promotional CD, Syria (2009)
- Tamas Project: Improvising 1 CD and 1 Video, Germany (2010)
- The Epic of Gilgamesh, Composition: Abed Azrie, CD+DVD Germany-France (2011)
- Up to 20 different Music Tracks for Mohamed Fityan promotional CD
- Soloist in famous Arabic Program "The Voice" MBC National T.V(2014)
- With the Famous Jordanian Music Composer Tareq Al-Nasser ( 2013–2014)
- Passio-Compassion concert and CD recording in Opera Sultanate of Omanis(2014)

== Other activities ==
- Workshop with the international flutist Pedro Eustache, Syria (2009)
- Workshop with the Turkish Ney Player Ali Tufuktchi, Syria (2007)

== Music director ==
- Aleppo Musical Band of the Revolution Youth Union Syria (2000–2003)
- “Asamina” Band Syria (2004–2010)
- “Nahawand” Band of al-Assad Youth Institute for Music in Syria since (2005–2010)
- Syrian Youth Band for Arabic Music in Syria since (2007–2012)

== Awards and honors ==
- Best Ney Player Award, Contest of Syrian Youth Musicians (2002)
- Best Conductor Award, Contest of Syrian Youth Musicians (2003)
- The first Arabic Ney player with the Syrian Jazz Big Band in its first concert at Damascus Castle (2005)
- Soloist with Syrian classical and modern bands (Ara-Sham, Josour, Kimya, High Temperature, etc.)
