= Turkish ney =

Ottoman end-blown flute made of reed

Turkish Shah Ney

The Turkish ney is an end-blown flute made of reed, an Ottoman variation on the ancient ney. Together with the Turkish tanbur lute and Turkish kemençe fiddle are considered the most typical instruments of Classical Turkish music. The ney also plays a primary role in the music of the Mevlevi Sufi rites (semâ).

== Description ==
A rim-blown, oblique flute made of giant reed (Arundo donax), the Turkish ney has six finger-holes on the front and a high-set thumb-hole on the back. The thumb hole is not centered but rather is angled to the left or right depending on whether the instrument was intended to be played with the left or right hand on top.

A feature that distinguishes it from similar instruments of other cultures is the flared mouthpiece or lip rest, called a bashpare, traditionally made of water buffalo horn, ivory, or ebony, but in modern times many are plastic or similar durable material.

The Turkish ney is played by pressing the bashpare against nearly-closed lips and angling the flute so that a narrow air stream can be blown from the center of the lips against the interior edge to the left or right, depending on whether the flute is left- or right-handed in construction. This technique gives a lower volume, but a better-controlled sound compared to the technique used with the Persian ney or the Mongolian tsuur, which are played by tucking the mouthpiece under the upper lip and making contact with the teeth.

Besides the finger holes, the pitch is altered by adjusting the embouchure, angle, and force of the breath, with more forceful producing the higher pitches.

Compared to most fipple flutes and reed instruments, the ney is very difficult to play at first, often taking several weeks of practice to produce a proper sound at all, and even more to produce the full range of pitches. A skilled ney player can sound around 100 identifiable different tones in a two-and-a-half octave range or more.

== Sizes ==
Before the tone naming convention do-re-mi-etc.. was adopted in Turkey, the notes had full long names which still partially are in use in ney circles, for example as names of fingering for a given perde (the set of pitches used in the performance).

Perde Name	Fingering	Note (Lowest register of a Mansur Ney)
Neva	● ○ ● ○ ○ ● ○	D
Nim hicaz	● ● ○ ○ ○ ● ○	C#
Çargah	● ● ● ○ ○ ● ○	C
Segah	● ● ● ● ○ ● ○	B
Kürdi	● ● ● ● ● ○ ○	B♭
Dügah	● ● ● ● ● ● ○	A
Rast	● ● ● ● ● ● ●	G

Neys come in many lengths, each producing a different key. Professional players usually possess a range of ney in different keys so they match other instruments in an ensemble.

In some Turkish musical circles, the "pitch" (akord) of a ney is determined by the tone produced by its rast perde. For example, some refer to the note generated with all holes closed, meaning Davud would be in E, Bolahenk nısfiye would be in D, and Ṣah would be in F.
In others, the pitch is determined using the note (perde) which matches A=440 Hz (diyapazon). This pitch is one note higher, e.g., Mansur being A/La rather than G/Sol. The lengths below are approximate, as it can vary somewhat due to the natural characteristics of the individual reed.

Ney name	Length (average)	Dügah tone (old name)	Dügah tone (Turkish)	Dügah tone (piano)
Bolahenk Nısfiye	520 mm	Hüseyni	La	E / Mi
Bolahenk-Süpürde Mabeyni	550 mm	Hisar	Sol diyez	E♭ / Mi bemol
Süpürde Ney	580 mm	Neva	Sol	D / Re
Müstahsen	620 mm	Nim Hicaz	Fa diyez	C♯ / Do diyez
Yıldız Ney	665 mm	Çargah	Fa	C / Do
Kız Ney	710 mm	Buselik	Mi	H / Si
Kız-Mansur Mabeyni	745 mm	Dik Kürdi	Mi bemol	B♭ / Si bemol
Mansur Ney	780 mm	Dügah	Re	A / La
Mansur-Şah Mabeyni	820 mm	Zirgüle	Do diyez	G♯ / Sol diyez
Şah Ney	860 mm	Rast	Do	G / Sol
Davud Ney	910 mm	Irak	Si	F♯ / Fa diyez
Davud-Bolahenk Mabeyni	970 mm	Acem Aşiran	Si bemol	F / Fa
Bolahenk Ney	1 m 40 mm	Hüseyni Aşiran	La	E / Mi

== Players ==
A Turkish ney player is referred to as a neyzen. A curious distinction in the Turkish language is that playing the ney is described using the verb üflemek ("blow") whereas for all other instrumentalists, one uses the verb çalmak ("play/brush"). It is speculated that the ney's close identification with the Mevlevi Sufis might be the origin of this usage (God made Adam out of mud, and then "blew" life into it).

Noted modern ney players include Niyazi Sayın, Akagündüz Kutbay, Sadreddin Özçimi, Kudsi Erguner, Süleyman Erguner (torun).

== Fingering ==
The following is a description of how fingering, blow angle and blow intensity (roughly represented with symbols for wind speed and direction borrowed from USNWS) are combined to create the tones in a popular scale ("Hüseyni") on a common Turkish ney type (Bolahenk). Note that some pitches can be produced two different ways.

Hüseyni scale on a Bolahenk ney
Blow	Fingering	Hertz	Note
	● ● ● ● ● ● ●	587	A
	● ● ● ● ● ● ○	660	B
	● ● ● ● ○ ● ○	739	C
	● ● ● ○ ○ ● ○	783	D
	● ○ ● ○ ○ ● ○	880	E
	○ ● ○ ● ○ ● ○	927	F
	○ ○ ○ ● ○ ● ○	1043	G
	● ● ● ● ● ● ●	1174	A
	● ● ● ● ● ● ○	1321	B
	● ● ● ● ○ ● ○	-	C
	● ● ● ○ ○ ● ○	1566	D
	● ● ● ● ● ● ●	1761	E
	● ○ ● ○ ○ ● ○	1761	E
	● ● ● ● ● ● ○	-	F
	● ● ● ● ○ ● ○	-	G
	● ● ● ○ ○ ● ○	2348	A
	● ● ● ● ● ● ●	2348	A
	● ● ● ● ● ● ○	-	B
	● ○ ● ○ ○ ● ○	-	B
	● ● ● ● ○ ● ○	-	C
	● ● ● ○ ○ ● ○	3132	D
	● ○ ● ○ ○ ● ○	3522	E
	● ● ● ● ○ ● ○	-	F
	● ● ● ○ ○ ● ○	-	G
	● ○ ● ○ ○ ● ○	4696	A
	● ● ● ○ ○ ● ○	-	B

There are hundreds of similar scales in use in classical Turkish music. Hüseyni is probably the most frequently used. A dozen of the most common scales account for an important majority of all Turkish classical music, while many are seldom used.

== Related instruments ==
The classical Turkish ney's closest relatives in other countries, the Arab nay and the Persian ney, do not use a mouthpiece, but rather blow against the sharpened edge of the tube. In Turkish folk music, one type of ney (dilli kaval) has a fipple; the other type (dilsiz) is a rim-blown oblique flute, as is the Turkish classical ney. The Bulgarian kaval, a folk instrument, resembles the Turkish dilsiz folk ney. The Romanian nai is a panpipe rather than a flute but may be related etymologically and morphologically.

== Popular media ==
Ney Taksimi/Aziz İstanbul a composition by Münip Utandı is the most sampled Turkish ney song on the Internet, being sampled by several media. Ney Taksimi means improvisation at the ney instrument. The following is a table showing the songs that used the original sample (the first 2 min. of the recording are linked at the top row).

Münip Utandı's Ney Taksimi used in various media
Artist	Track	Year	Genre	Album	Link
Münip Utandı	Ney Taksimi; Aziz İstanbul	1998	Traditional Turkish Folk	N/A	YouTube
Muslimgauze	Turkish Sword Swallower	2000	Tribal, Experimental	Sufique EP	YouTube
Sergio Marques	Morningside	2007	Trance	Special Collector's Edition 2	beatport
King Mokka	Léïli	2007	Electro House	Léïli	YouTube
YOJI	Sandwich (Nhato Remix)	2011	House, Techno, Hard Trance	Sandwich EP	YouTube
BluSkay & KeyPlayer	Giza	2014	Progressive Trance	N/A	YouTube
Alexandre Bergheau & Geert Huinink	Desert Wings (Original Mix)	2015	Trance	Desert Wings	YouTube
Kelly Bailey	Nepal Monastery	1998	Soundtrack	Half-Life	YouTube

== See also ==
- Kaval
- Kawala
- Ney
