= Kawala =

Arabic musical instrument

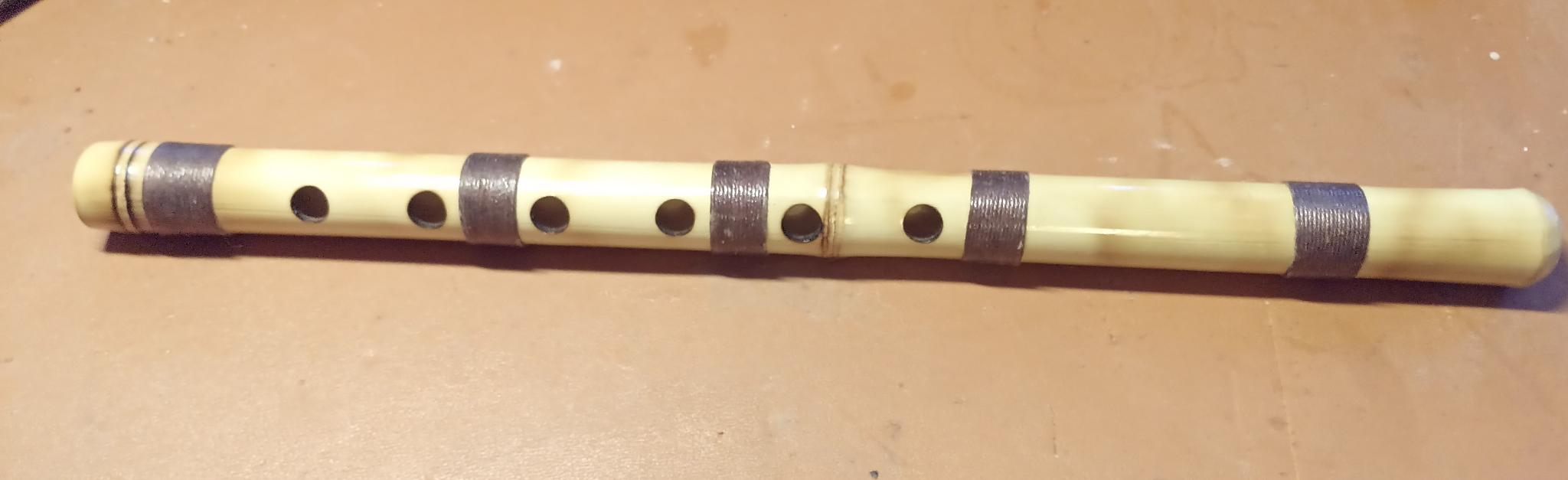
- Kawala built by Nashenas Naujawan

Woodwind instrument
- Classification: Woodwind instrument

Related instruments
- Ney, Kaval

The kāwālā (Arabic: كاوالا or كولة; also called salamiya, سلامية) is an end-blown cane flute used in Arabic music. It is similar to the ney but has six finger holes, while the ney has seven (including one in the back). The kawala comes in up to nine different sizes, according to the maqam.

Though very similar to the ney, a highly popular flute in traditional Middle Eastern music, the kawala does not have a hole in the back as the ney does. The kawala has the fundamental tonal structure customary among the Egyptian folk music community, and the basis for many folk melodies, instrumental or vocal.

The kawala is hollow and has four knots, with six fingerholes in a straight line along it. The instrument has up to nine different sizes, according to the scale required in a musical composition. Most often played today at religious festivals and weddings, it has its origin as a shepherds tool, used to guide their flock. For this reason the seems to assist in any musical composition that contains a “call-and-response” sequence.

== Players ==
Ahmed El Arnab is considered one of the most prestigious kawala players in Egypt and worldwide. Living in a small village of Sharqia governorate in Egypt, he has been traveling worldwide playing with many Egyptian Sufi singers, including Sheikh Yassine Al-Tohamy and other western composers. He also regularly participates in national folklore carnivals (Mawlid) all over Egypt. He is one of the oldest surviving players in Egypt whose unique signature is the ability to produce various sound effects on the instrument using the circular breathing technique.

Ibrahim Shahin – who used to play in Mawawil – was another well-known Egyptian kawala player. He was an internationally travelled musician who once played regularly at events in his village and at larger shows in Egypt.

== Production ==
The maker of the kawala selects his reeds while they are still in the earth, and scoops out the inside, hollowing them out so that they stop growing taller but instead grow thicker and harder. The reeds are left in the earth until they are ripe for harvest, at which point they are culled and left in the sun to dry out completely. Then comes the stage of dividing each stalk into segments of four knots each, starting at the thinner end, so that a musician gets (in order) a leading pipe and a following pipe in a 1:2 ratio (two follower pipes for each leader). The maker is careful to select the leader and its follower from the same stalk so as to ensure uniformity in the color of the tone. The internal divisions that divide the reed into chambers at each knot from the inside are then removed, resulting in a hollow pipe open at both ends. Any excess is then trimmed away, together with the remainder of the internal divisions, for a smooth, even interior texture.

== See also ==
- Ney
- Ney (Turkish)
- Kaval
- Kwela
