= End-blown flute =

Woodwind musical instrument

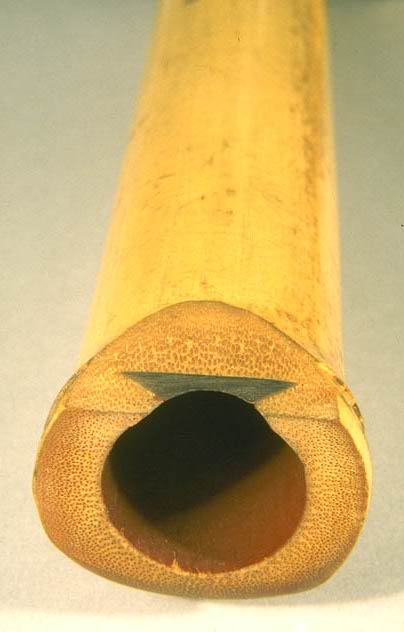
A shakuhachi showing its utaguchi (blowing edge) and inlay

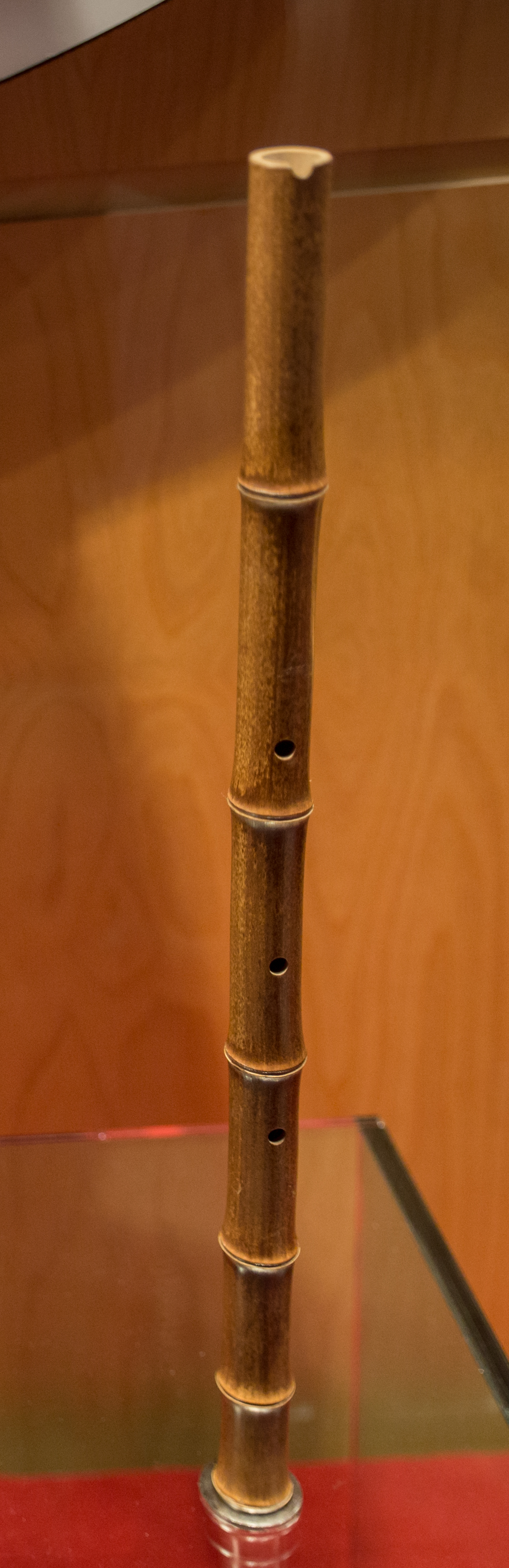
Notched flute, showing U-shaped notch in the instrument’s rim.

The end-blown flute (also called an edge-blown flute or rim-blown flute) is a woodwind instrument played by directing an airstream against the sharp edge of the upper end of a tube. Unlike a recorder or tin whistle, there is not a ducted flue voicing, also known as a fipple. Most rim-blown flutes are "oblique" flutes, being played at an angle to the body's vertical axis. A notched flute is an end-blown flute with a notch on the blowing surface. A lip-valley flute is a type of notched flute.

End-blown flutes are widespread in folk music and art music. In Europe, the Russians have the svirel, attested from at least the 11th century. In the Middle East and Mediterranean the ney is frequently used, constructed from reed. Depictions of early versions of the ney can be found in wall paintings in ancient Egyptian tombs, indicating that it is one of the oldest musical instruments in continuous use. Several ancient Persian artworks depict the use of the ney.

The Persian ney has six finger holes, is blown with a specific technique that is found in a couple other occurrence by creating a flow of air between the tongue and the upper teeth while keeping the blowing end under the upper lip. Modern instruments often use a piece of plastic rolled in a tube to protect the instrument, older instrument could use copper.

The Arabic nay and the Turkish ney are played differently, outside the mouth, blowing the air towards the circumference of the mouth end, and feature seven finger holes - both are played in the same fashion but the Turkish version has an added horn or wood mouthpiece to facilitate the technique.

In Turkey the ney and kaval are both end-blown, although one type of Turkish kaval (dilli kaval) has a fipple. The kaval is also played throughout the Balkan countries of Bulgaria, Albania, Serbia, North Macedonia, and elsewhere. The Turkish ney plays a prominent role in classical Turkish music and Mevlevi (Sufi) music.

China has the xiao, Japan has the shakuhachi and Korea has the danso and tongso. People of the Andes play the quena, the Hopi and their predecessors the Ancestral Puebloans of the American southwest have and had a lain-ah flute using techniques similar to the neys (both Arabic and Persian). The washint is an East African flute. Panpipes are rim-blown in the same fashion with their lower ends stopped, bound together in a row or "raft".

In Polynesia, the Māori of New Zealand play a number of end-blown flutes with the oblique method, including the kōauau, the ngūru and the pūtõrino.

== See also ==
- Transverse flute
- Vertical flute
