= Ney =

Middle Eastern end-blown flute

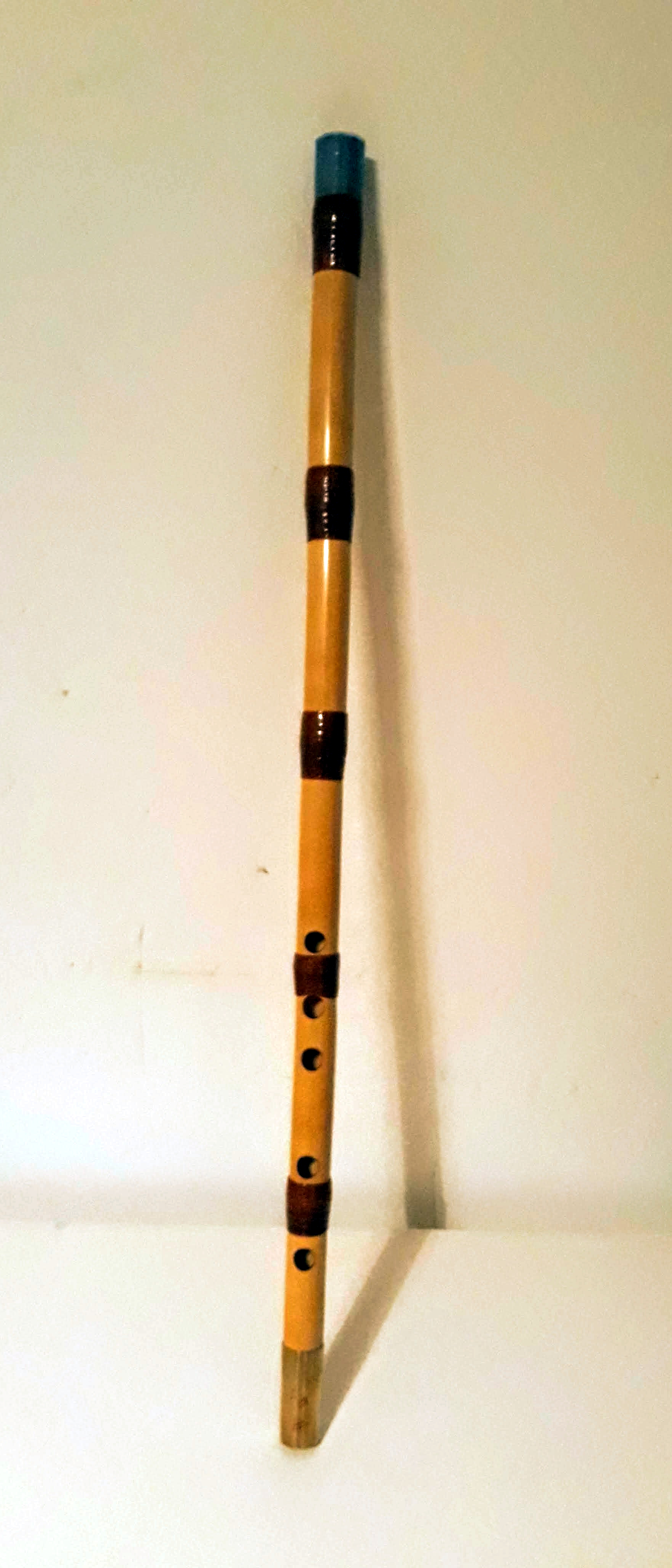
- Kurdish ney with six holes (one on the back)

Ancient
- Classification: End-blown
- Inventor: Egyptians

Playing range
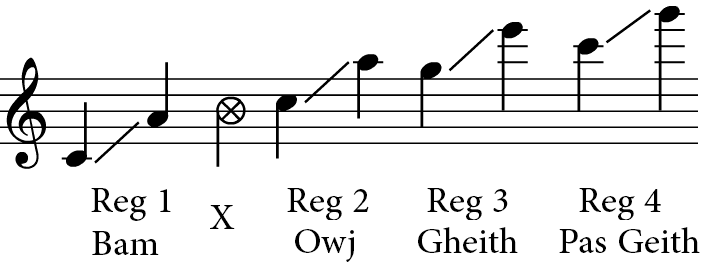

The ney (/neɪ/ NAY; Persian: نی) is an end-blown flute that figures prominently in traditional Kurdish, Persian, Turkish, Jewish, Arab, and Egyptian music. In some of these musical traditions, it is the only wind instrument used. The ney has been played for over 4,500 years, dating back to ancient Egypt, making it one of the oldest musical instruments still in use.

The ney consists of a piece of hollow cane or giant reed with five or six finger holes and one thumb hole. The Arabic ney is played without any mouthpiece. This contrasts with the Turkish ney that sometimes have a brass, horn, or plastic mouthpiece which is placed at the top to protect the wood, to produce a steeper sound, and protect it from damage, with a better edge to blow on. Modern neys may instead be made of metal or plastic tubing. The pitch of the ney varies depending on the region and the finger arrangement. A highly skilled ney player, called neyzen, can reach more than three octaves, though it is more common to have several "helper" neys to cover different pitch ranges or to facilitate playing technically difficult passages in other dastgahs or maqams.

In Romanian, this instrument is called "fluier"; the word nai is applied to a curved pan flute, while an end-blown flute resembling the Persian ney is referred to as kaval.

== Typology ==
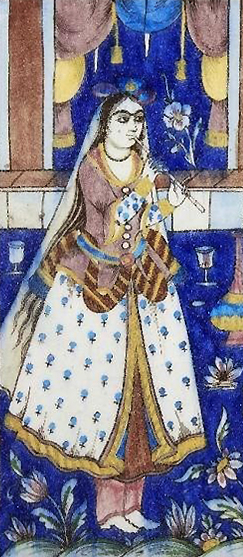
Ney, from a 19th-century Qajun Iran tile

The typical Persian ney has six holes, one of which is on the back. Arabic and Turkish neys normally have seven holes, six in front and one thumb-hole in the back.

The intervals between the holes can be minor and major seconds, as well as microtonal intervals (roughly 3 quarter tones) which could be referred to as neutral seconds in more western terms. Although microtones (and broader pitch inflections) are also achieved via partial hole-covering, changes of embouchure, or changing the instrument's positioning and the blowing angle. Microtonal inflection is common and crucial to various traditions of taqsim (improvisation in the same scale before a piece is played).

Neys are constructed in various keys. In the Egyptian and Arabic system, there are seven common ranges (the names are referring to Arabic note names, not maqams):

1. Rast, the longest and lowest-pitched which is roughly equivalent to C in the Western equal temperament system.
2. Dukah in D, the most common one.
3. Busalik in E
4. Jaharka in F
5. Nawa in G
6. Hussayni in A
7. Ajam in B (or B♭)

Advanced players will typically own a set of several neys in various keys, although it is possible (albeit difficult) to play fully chromatically on any instrument. A slight exception to this rule is found in the extreme lowest range of the instrument, where the fingering becomes quite complex and the transition from the first octave (fundamental pitches) to the second is rather awkward.

== Kargı düdük ==
The kargı düdük is a long reed flute whose origin, according to legend, is connected with Alexander the Great, and a similar instrument existed in ancient Egypt. Kargı in Turkish means reed (Arundo donax, also known as Giant reed). The sound of the gargy-tuyduk has much in common with the two-voiced kargyra. During the playing of the gargy-tuyduk the melody is clearly heard, while the lower droning sound is barely audible.

The allay epic songs have been described by the Turkologist N. Baskakov who divides them into three main types:

- Kutilep kayla: the second sound is a light drone.
- Sygyrtzip kayla: with a second whistling sound like the sound of a flute.
- Kargyrlap kayla: in which the second sound can be defined as hissing.

The sound of the Turkmen gargy-tuyduk is most like the Altay Kargyrkip kayla. The garg-tuyduk can have six finger holes and a length of 780 mm or five finger holes and a length of 550 mm. The range of the garg-tuyduk includes three registers:

- The lowest register – "non-working" – is not used during the playing of a melody.
- The same as on the "non-working" register but an octave higher.
- High register from mi of the second octave to ti.

== Pamiri nay ==
The Pamiri nay (Tajik: най) is a transverse flute made of wood or, in eastern Badakhshan, eagle bone. Although the name is similar to the Arabic end-blown nay, it might well be that this side-blown flute is more related to Chinese flutes such as the dizi—perhaps via a Mongol link.

It is used for solo melodies as well as with orchestras and for vocal accompaniment. One of the main uses of the nay is for the most original form of the traditional performance falaki.

These are brief melodic sessions which can express complaints against destiny, the injustice of heaven or exile to distant places, and sentiments such as the sorrow of a mother separated from her daughter, the sorrow of a lover torn from her/his beloved, etc.

== Other forms with similar names ==
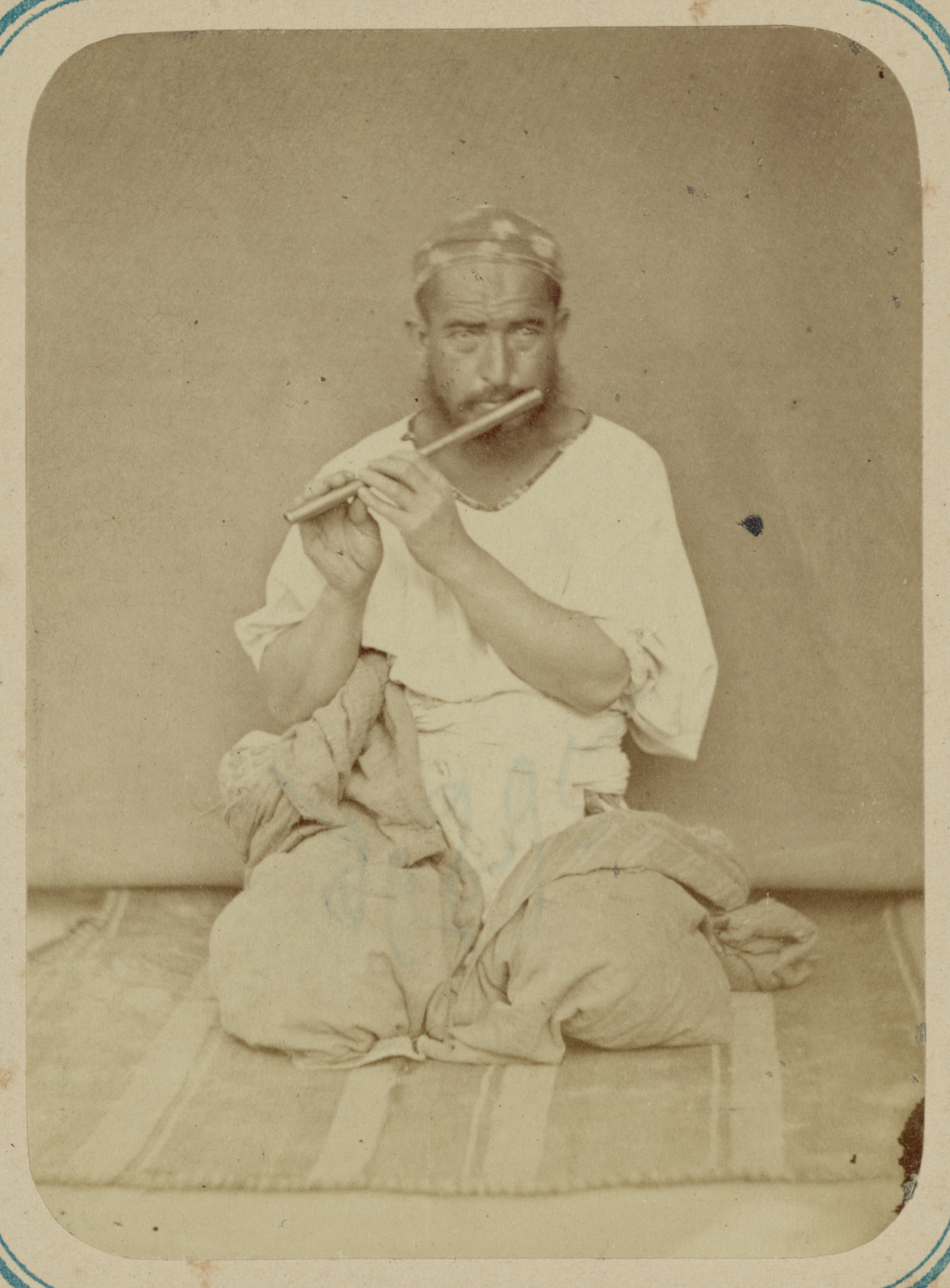
This ney from Russian Turkestan, about 1872, was a transverse flute.

The ney of Uzbekistan, Tajikistan and Karakalpakstan is a transverse flute that can be made of different materials, often indicated by a prefix in the name. The agach-nai is a wooden flute, the garau-nai a bamboo flute, the misnai a flute made of sheet iron and the brindgzhi-nai a brass flute.

The Romanian pan flute nai consists of at least 20 to over 30 pipes closed at the bottom, which are connected to each other in a slight arc.

== See also ==
- Kawala, a similar instrument used in Arabic music
- Ottoman music
- Tambin, a similar instrument used in West African music
- Tin whistle
- Tsuur, a similar instrument used in Mongolian music
- Turkish ney
- Washint, a similar instrument used in East African music

== General bibliography ==
- Effat, Mahmoud (2005). Beginner's Guide to the Nay. Translated by Jon Friesen; originally published in Arabic in 1968. Pitchphork Music. ISBN 0-9770192-0-9.
- Marwan Hassan (2010). Kawala & Nay: Die Ur-Flöten der Menschheit: Bauen, stimmen, pflegen und spielen. [German: Explaining How to Build and Play the Kawala, Saluang, or Ghab and Ney-Flute]
