= Indonesia–Mexico relations =

- Indonesia: Mexico

The nations of Indonesia and Mexico established diplomatic relations in 1953. Both nations view their counterpart as strategic partners in each other's regions; Indonesia in Southeast Asia and Mexico in Latin America. Both nations are members of the Asia-Pacific Economic Cooperation, Forum of East Asia-Latin America Cooperation, Group of 15, G20, MIKTA, United Nations, and the World Trade Organization.

== History ==
The first contact between both nations may have taken place with the Manila‑Acapulco Galleon between Acapulco, Mexico and Manila (capital of the Spanish crown in the Philippines). During the Spanish occupation of the Papuan speaking Indonesian Sultanates of Ternate and Tidore in the Moluccas, the Spanish used soldiers recruited from the Philippines and Mexico to occupy those Indonesian kingdoms. There is also the curious case of the Indonesia-born soldier, Alexo de Castro of the Moluccas; being tried before the Mexican Inquisition for Crypto-Islam. The Spanish traded with the Dutch and Portuguese ports in South-East Asia, and returned to Mexico with goods (and people) from the region.

In August 1945, Indonesia won independence from the Netherlands. On 6 April 1953, Indonesia and Mexico established diplomatic relations. Soon afterwards, the Mexican ambassador resident in Tokyo, Japan was accredited to Indonesia. It was not until 1961 that Mexico named a resident ambassador to Indonesia. In 1959, President Sukarno became the first Indonesian head-of-state to visit Mexico. In 1962, Mexican President Adolfo López Mateos paid an official visit to Indonesia.

Indonesian President Susilo Bambang Yudhoyono paid an official visit to Mexico in 2008 and again in 2012 to attend the APEC summit in Los Cabos. In May 2013, Indonesian Foreign Affair Minister Marty Natalegawa paid a visit to Mexico to commemorate the 60th anniversary of Indonesia-Mexico diplomatic relations. To commemorate this event, the Mexican and Indonesian postal services issued a joint stamp illustrating animals as the symbol of both nations; the Mexican Jaguar (Panthera onca hernandesii) and Indonesian Clouded Leopard (Neofelis diardi). In 2013, Mexican President Enrique Peña Nieto paid a visit to Bali to attend the 25th APEC summit.

In July 2022, Mexican Foreign Minister Marcelo Ebrard paid a visit to Bali to attend a summit of the G20 foreign ministers. While in Bali, Ebrard also met the Indonesian Foreign Minister Retno Marsudi and both ministers attended a meeting of MIKTA member nations. In November 2022, Foreign Minister Ebrard returned to Indonesia to attend the G20 Bali Summit.

Both countries have held seven bilateral consultation, with the last one held in December 2020 through virtual manner due to the COVID-19 pandemic. In April 2023, both nations celebrated 70 years of diplomatic relations.

== High-level visits ==
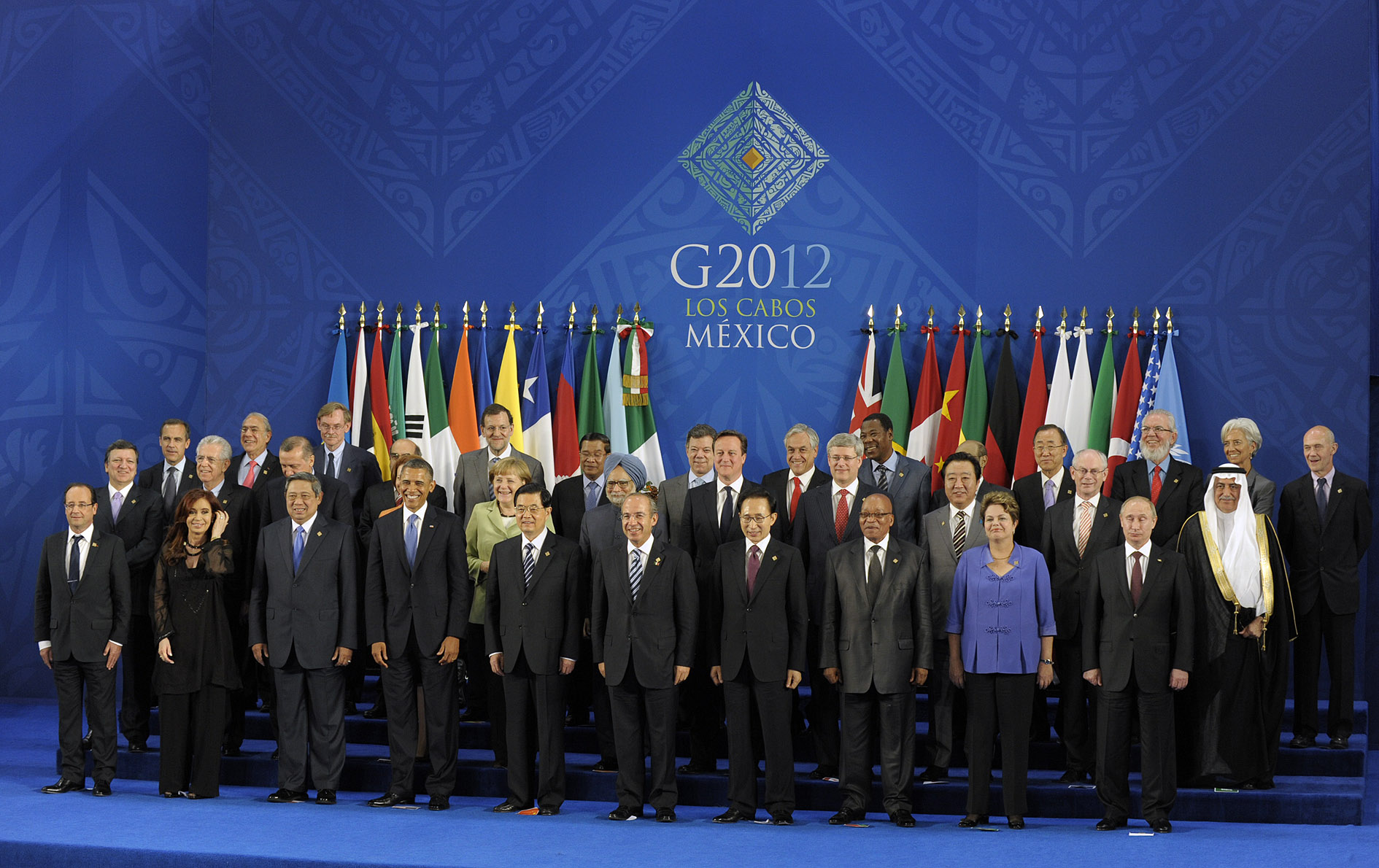
Indonesian President Susilo Bambang Yudhoyono attending the G-20 summit in Los Cabos; 2012.

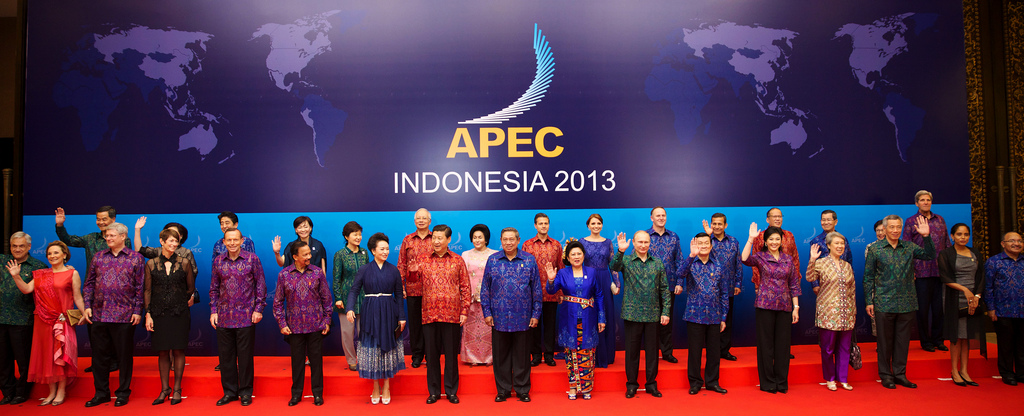
Mexican President Enrique Peña Nieto attending the APEC summit in Bali; 2013.

High-level visits from Indonesia to Mexico

- President Sukarno (1959, 1960, 1961)
- President Suharto (1991)
- President Abdurrahman Wahid (2000)
- President Megawati Soekarnoputri (2002)
- President Susilo Bambang Yudhoyono (2008, 2012)
- Foreign Minister Marty Natalegawa (2013)

High-level visits from Mexico to Indonesia

- President Adolfo López Mateos (1962)
- President Carlos Salinas de Gortari (1994)
- Foreign Minister José Ángel Gurría (1996)
- Foreign Minister Jorge Castañeda Gutman (2001)
- President Enrique Peña Nieto (2013)
- Foreign Minister José Antonio Meade (2013)
- Foreign Minister Marcelo Ebrard (July and November 2022)

== Bilateral agreements ==
Both nations have signed several bilateral agreements, such as an Agreement on Trade (1961); Agreement on Scientific and Technical Cooperation (1996); Agreement on Educational and Cultural Cooperation (2001); Memorandum on the establishment of mutual bilateral consultations between both nations (2001); Agreement to Avoid Double Taxation and Prevent Tax Evasion in the Matter of Income Taxes and its Protocol (2002); Agreement on Air Transportation Services (2013); Memorandum of Understanding in Tourism Cooperation (2013) and a Memorandum of Understanding in Export Credit Cooperation (2013).

== Education and culture ==
The Government of Mexico offers the SRE (Ministry of Foreign Affairs) Postgraduate Scholarship for Indonesians who want to study a postgraduate in Mexico. The Government of Indonesia offers Darmasiswa cultural scholarships so that young Mexicans can learn the Indonesian culture (language, music, theater, batik, dance, etc.) as well as the KNB scholarship for postgraduate level.

There exist several groups of Indonesian art and culture in Mexico, starting in 2002 when Fitra Ismu Kusumo founded the group Indra Swara for promoting the art of music (gamelan) and wayang puppets of Indonesia; in 2005 Maestra Graciela Lopez founded the Indonesian traditional dance group ¨Tari Bali¨; and then in 2015 another dance group was founded called ¨Mirah Delima¨. There are also the Pencak Silat martial arts groups led by Maestro Ramon Yee, Maestro Hector Becerril, and Maestro Raymundo Wong, as well as the batik art school founded by Master Francisco Sorensic.

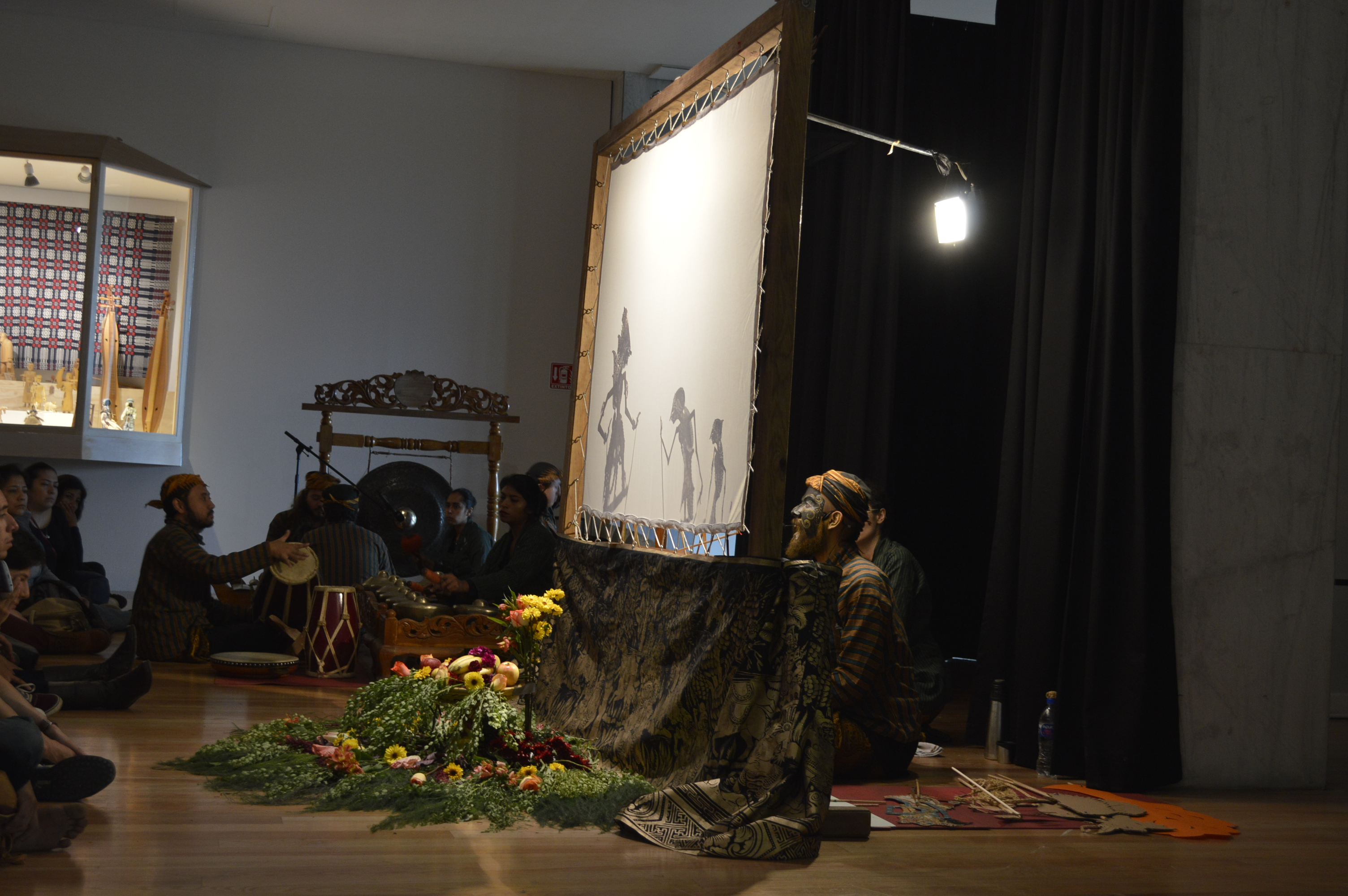
Wayang kulit Indra Swara in Spanish language-CCU Tlatelolco UNAM

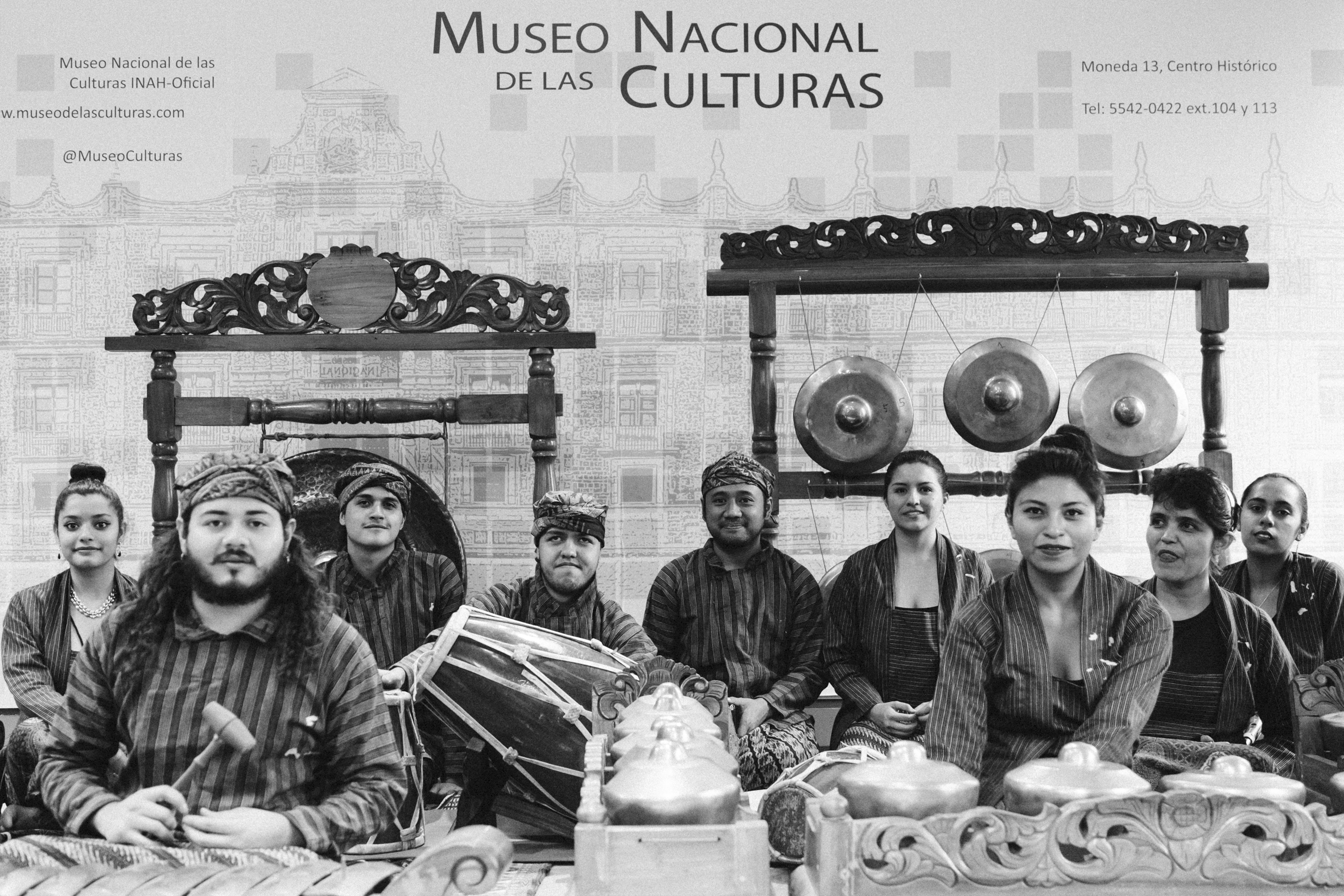
Gamelan group Indra Swara in Mexico

== Trade relations ==
In 2023, two-way trade between both nations amounted to US$3 billion. Indonesia main exports products include: motor vehicles, telephones and mobile phones, household appliances, product of iron or non-alloy steel, chemical based products, clothing and shoes, jewelry, fruits and nuts, and petroleum. Mexico's main export products include: telephones and mobile phones, data processing machines, tubes and pipes of iron or steel, chemical based products, parts and accessories for motor vehicles, leather, and alcohol. Mexican multinational company, KidZania, operates in Indonesia.

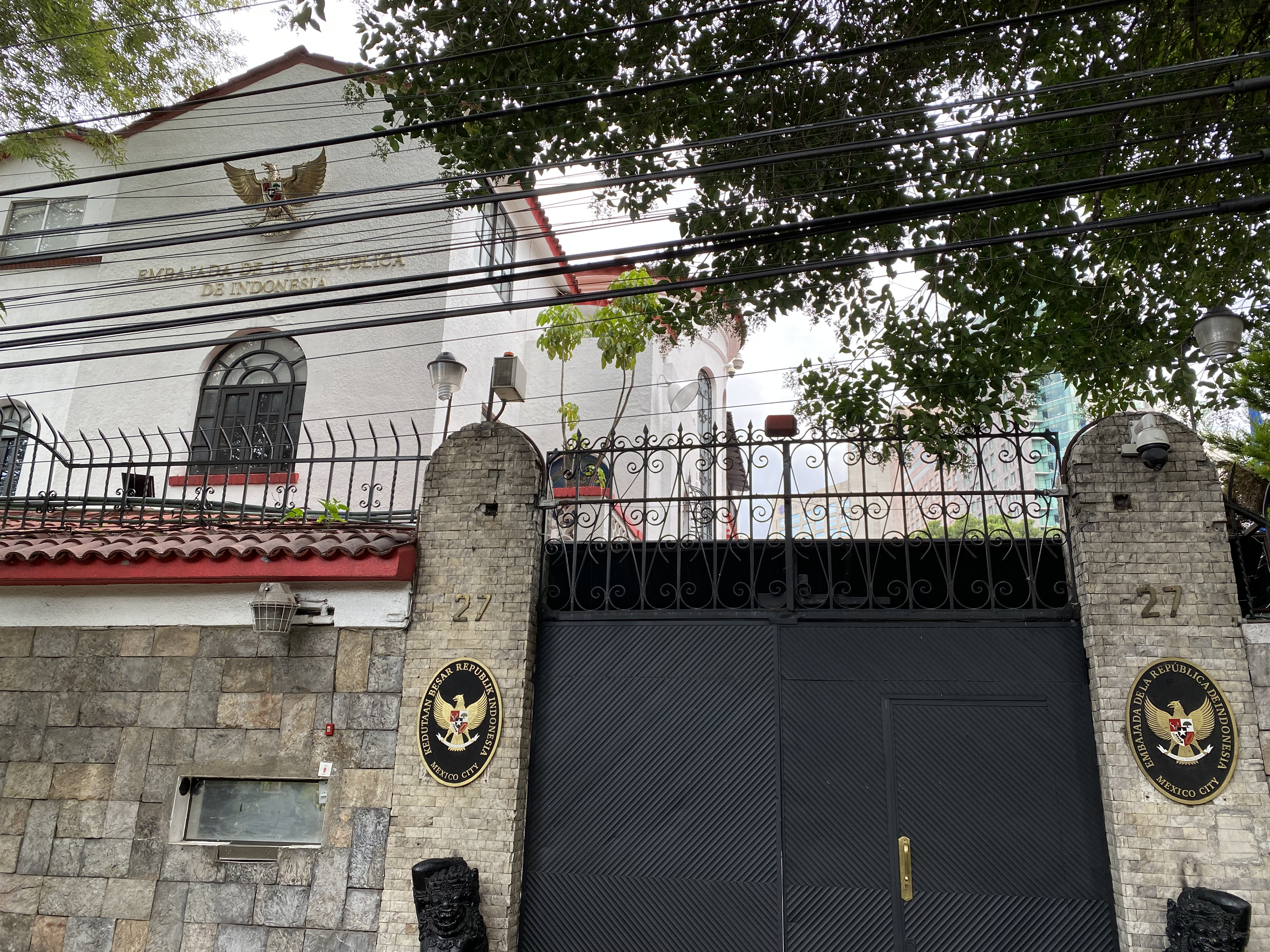
Embassy of Indonesia in Mexico City

== Resident diplomatic missions ==
- Indonesia has an embassy in Mexico City.
- Mexico has an embassy in Jakarta and honorary consulates in Denpasar and Yogyakarta.

== See also ==
- Asian Mexicans
- Foreign relations of Indonesia
- Foreign relations of Mexico
