= Fitra Ismu Kusumo =

Indonesian culture promotor in Mexico

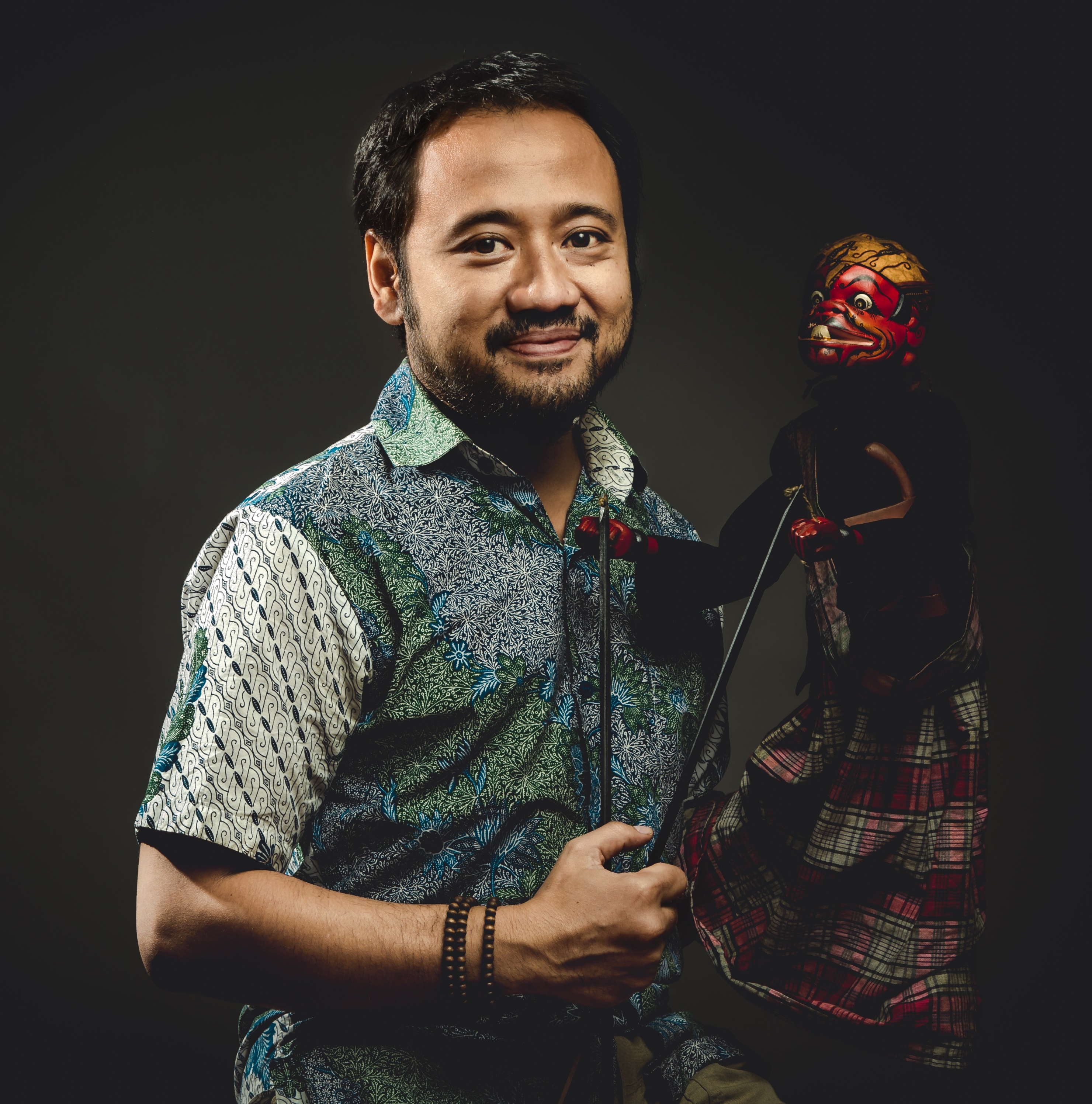
- Born: 1977 (age 48–49); Surakarta, Indonesia
- Occupations: Director of Halal Quality Mexico, coordinator of Indra swara

Fitra Ismu Kusumo is a promoter of Indonesian art and Culture in Mexico, since 2002 and founder of Indra Swara, introducing Indonesia through Gamelan (Indonesian traditional Music), Indonesian traditional dances and also through its puppeteering art (Wayang Kulit and Wayang Golek). As a researcher his area of specialty is Muslims and Islam in Mexico and Latin America.

== Early time in Mexico ==
He founded Indra Swara, introducing Gamelan to young art students from Centro Nacional de las Artes, the Escuela Nacional de Musica, and from the Conservatorio de Musica of Mexico City inviting them to be a part of the ensemble. In 2002 he began studying his master's degree at the Escuela Nacional de Antropologia e Historia(ENAH) in Mexico City. In 2003 he started working at the Indonesian Embassy in Mexico City, and in 2004 was contacted by the Topos de Tlatelolco, Mexican Rescue team to be part of them in the Aceh Tsunami aid Mission-2004 Indian Ocean earthquake and tsunami, in the Jogyakarta 2006 Yogyakarta earthquake relief mission and in the Padang 2009 Sumatra earthquakes relief mission.

== Studies ==
Bachelor of Arts in French Literature from the Gadjah Mada University (UGM) in Indonesia. He completed his master's and doctorate degrees (earning an honorific mention) in History and Ethno-History at the National School of Anthropology and History (ENAH) in Mexico, his field of specialization being Muslims and Islam in Mexico and Latin America.

== Career ==
Since 2016, he's been working to promote halal products from Mexico to Muslim countries. Likewise, he is constantly promoting and raising awareness regarding the Halal issue and Halal certification. He has worked at OMECEGA (2016-2017) and at RACS, a certification body of the United Arab Emirates (2017-2019), and in July 2019, with support from Muslim communities in Mexico, he founded the Mexican Halal certification body "Halal Quality Mexico S.A. de C.V." in Mexico City.

He has worked at the Embassy of the Republic of Indonesia(2003-2012) promoting the image and culture of his country, and as a liaison between the Embassy and institutions in Mexico and Central America. He has also taught Indonesian traditional music, dance and culture in different institutions throughout the country, including the Conservatorio Nacional de Música (Mexico). Within Indra Swara he is coordinator and teacher of Gamelan music and Traditional Puppet Art of Indonesia (wayang).

His publications include: "Islam in Latin America" volumes I, II and III, "Islam in Contemporary Mexico" and "Islam for Beginners", all of them available in electronic format. He is a contributor to the magazine FMPM Magazine Indonesia, correspondent for detik.com, the largest and most important online news program in Indonesia, as well as a permanent correspondent for Aktual Network, aktual.co

He has made several presentations (including conferences, seminars, workshops, exhibitions, performances, etc.) as a means to promote Indonesian art and culture amongst Spanish speakers. Throughout his career he has also participated as a speaker and lecturer in different venues in Mexico (including the Research Center on Latin America and the Caribbean of National Autonomous University of Mexico, the Autonomous University of Yucatán (Universidad Autónoma de Yucatán), the ENAH, the Monterrey Institute of Technology and Higher Education, among others) in relation to his field of study.

== Books ==
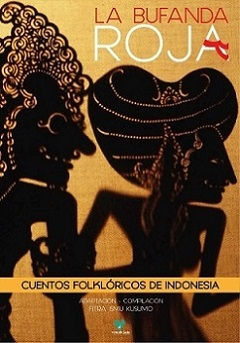
Cuentos folclóricos de Indonesia

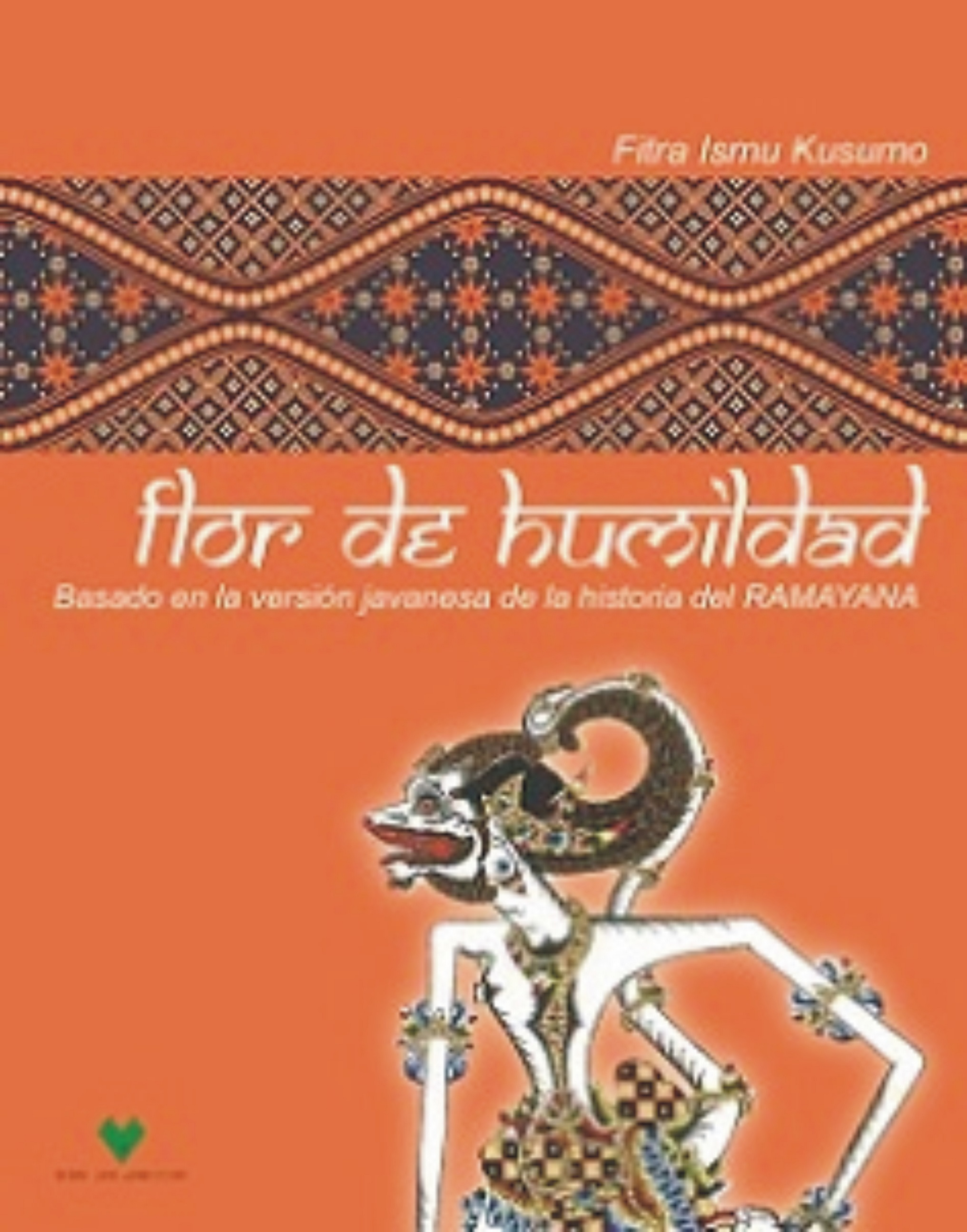
Flor de Humildad
1. El Islam Para Principiantes
2. El Islam en el Mexico Contemporaneo
3. El Islam en América Latina
4. Indonesio Para Hispanohablantes
5. Flor de Humildad-historia javanesa de Ramayana
6. Cuentos folkloricos de Indonesia

== TV reports ==
1. Sánchez, Karla Iberia (2014). "About Fitra Ismu and Indra swara in FORO TV TELEVISA". Noticieros Televisa (in Spanish). Televisa.
2. Purnamasari, Febi (2016). "Kehidupan Umat Muslim di Meksiko, min. 01:28-11:12". Muslim traveler (in Indonesian). NET TV.
3. Purnamasari, Febi (2016). "Inspirasi- Inspiring person". Inspirasi (in Indonesian). NET TV.
4. Lopez, Edith (2014). "Presentan obras épicas de Indonesia con teatro de sombras". Cultura (in Spanish). Sistema de Noticias Tlaxcala.
5. Lopez, Edith (2014). "Semana de Indonesia en Tlaxcala". Cultura (in Spanish). Sistema de Noticias Tlaxcala.
6. Fitria, Dini (2013). "TV report 2013 About Islam in Mexico on TRANS7 Indonesia". Jazirah Islam. Season Ramadan 2013 (in Indonesian). TRANS TV. TRANS7.
7. Purnamasari, Febi (2016). "TV report 2016 About Islam en Mexico on NET TV Indonesia". Muslim traveler. Season Ramadhan 2016 (in Indonesian). NetMediatama. NET TV.
8. Putri, Didie (2017). "TV report 2017 About Mexico, its art tradition and Modern Industry, SI UNYIL Program-on TRANS 7 Indonesia". Laptop Si Unyil. Season Si Unyil keliling Dunia (in Indonesian). TRANSMedia. Trans7.
9. Medina, Rodrigo. "Clip Museo Nacional de las Culturas". Actividades del Museo (in Spanish). Museo Nacional de las Culturas.
10. Guzman, Maribel (2016). "Reporte Noticias donación de wayang al Museo Historia de títeres". Cultura (in Spanish). RN Noticias.
11. Novianto, Andi (2019). "Hobby Yang Mendunia". Si UNYIL (in Indonesian). TRANSTV Indonesia.
