= Hotel Ambacang =

Former hotel in Padang, Indonesia

The Ambacang Hotel
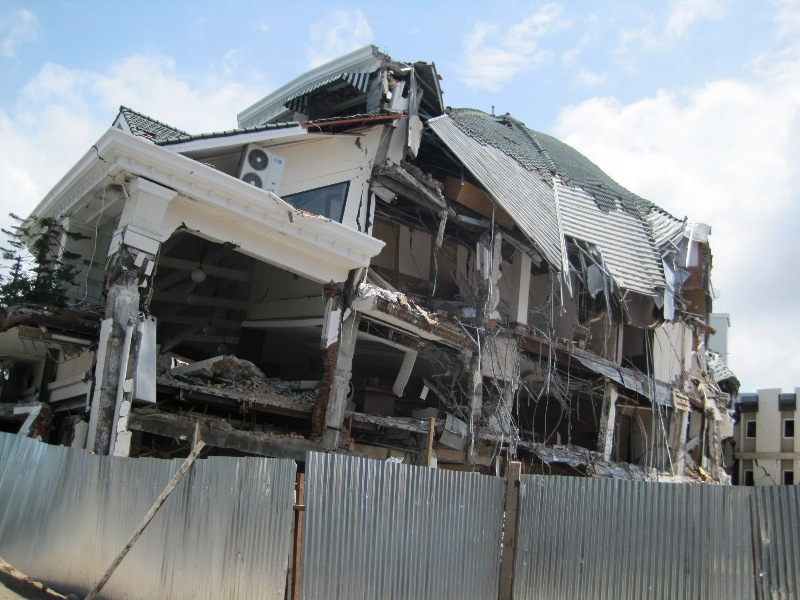
- Hotel Ambacang destroyed after the 2009 earthquake

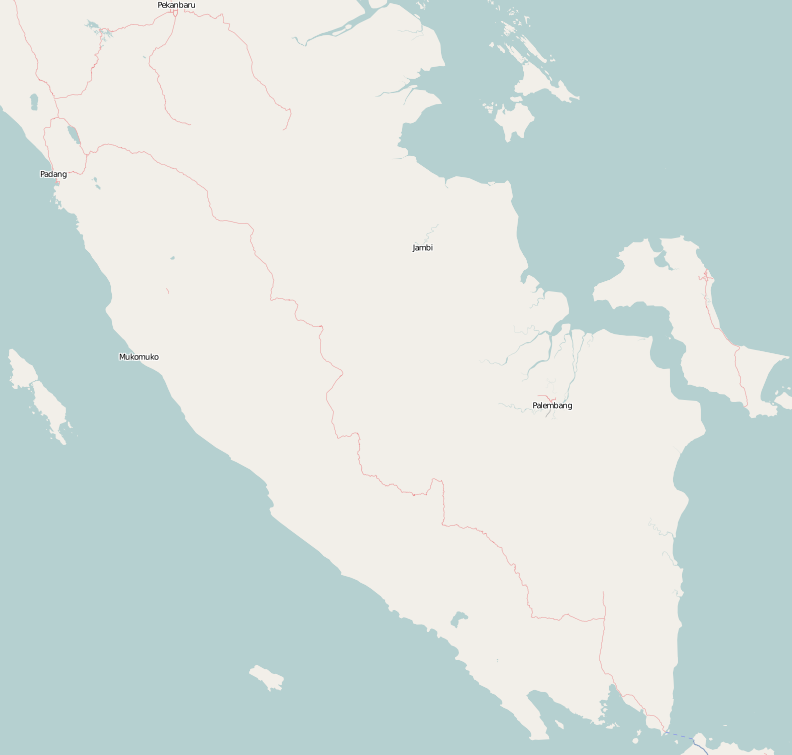
- Location in western Sumatra

General information
- Location: Jl. Bundo Kandung, No. 14-16, Padang, West Sumatra, Indonesia
- Coordinates: 0°57′15″S 100°21′30″E

Height
- Height: 16 metres (52 ft)

Technical details
- Floor count: 6

Hotel Ambacang was a hotel located in Padang, West Sumatra, Indonesia that was destroyed, with significant loss of life, by the major 2009 earthquake that struck West Sumatra.

In the Dutch colonial era, the building was used by the Central Trading Company and the Handelsvereeniging Harmsen Verwey & Dunlop N.V. When it became a hotel, it retained the architectural style and atmosphere of the Dutch colonial period.

Following its previous destruction in 2009, the ruins were demolished and a new hotel, now called The Axana Hotel, was built on the old site.
