= International Rescue Corps =

Volunteer organisation involved in disaster rescue

- Abbreviation: IRC
- Established: 1981
- Founded at: Medmenham, Buckinghamshire
- Dissolved: 2023
- Type: Charity
- Registration no.: 283031 (England & Wales); SC038213 (Scotland)
- Purpose: Urban search and rescue
- Headquarters: Grangemouth, Scotland
- Region served: Worldwide
- Members: 160 (2011)
- Co-founder: Terry Price
- Honorary president: Gerry Anderson (until c. 1992)
- Last president: Lord Selkirk of Douglas
- Last vice-presidents: Lord Foulkes of Cumnock; Jamie Anderson
- Remarks: Motto: "United To Save Life"

The International Rescue Corps (IRC) was a British volunteer organisation involved in disaster rescue. Its motto was "United To Save Life".

Formed in 1981, the IRC participated in relief efforts following the 1985 Mexico City earthquake and during the same year's Armero tragedy, as well as in the aftermath of Hurricane Hugo (1989), the 2003 Bam earthquake, the 2005 Kashmir earthquake and the 2009 Sumatra earthquakes. It also dispatched teams in response to the February 1998 Afghanistan earthquake and 2011 Tōhoku earthquake and tsunami.

In the UK, the IRC assisted following the Stockline Plastics factory explosion and during the 2009 Cumbria and southwest Scotland floods.

In 2023, it was reported that the IRC had dissolved.

== Overview ==
The IRC was an independent (non-government-funded), United Nations-registered disaster rescue service with an accredited National Open College Network (NOCN) qualification in urban search and rescue. As a charity, the IRC was supported entirely by donations from the public and sponsorship from industry. IRC members were unpaid volunteers and all services were provided free of charge – the organisation's sole aim was to save life. The IRC was named after the fictional emergency response organisation International Rescue in the Gerry Anderson TV series Thunderbirds.

The IRC was formed in 1981 in the aftermath of the 1980 Irpinia earthquake and became operational in 1985. It subsequently undertook missions both in the UK and around the world. Many missions were co-operative efforts working alongside other agencies, both nationally and internationally. Overseas missions included several earthquakes, hurricanes and subsequent floods, mudslides and logistical or aid work. UK missions include gas explosions, train crashes, highline rescues, missing person searches, and floods.

== Training and equipment ==
Originally, most IRC volunteers were emergency services personnel. They later included council workers, union representatives, management consultants, engineers and others. To carry out the IRC's role, operational members were required to satisfactorily complete a three-year training programme through the NOCN. Training consisted of learning about earthquakes, specialist search-and-rescue equipment, building construction, medical aid and casualty handling, boat handling, advanced rope skills, orienteering and map reading, helicopter coordination, humanitarian logistics and communications. After the first year of training, members could perform supporting roles in local and national missions; only after the full three years (with assessments) could they take part in operations overseas.

Equipment deployed by the IRC varied according to the nature of the disaster. Principal items included thermal imaging cameras, sound detectors, fibre optic probes, portable generators and lights, cutting equipment, tents, 15 days' supply of food, and water purification equipment. This enabled the IRC to operate without drawing on the resources of the host country. Satellite communication systems enabled the organisation to provide a reconnaissance and coordination service for the UN and other agencies if requested.
