= 2009 Sumatra earthquakes =

Earthquakes in Indonesia

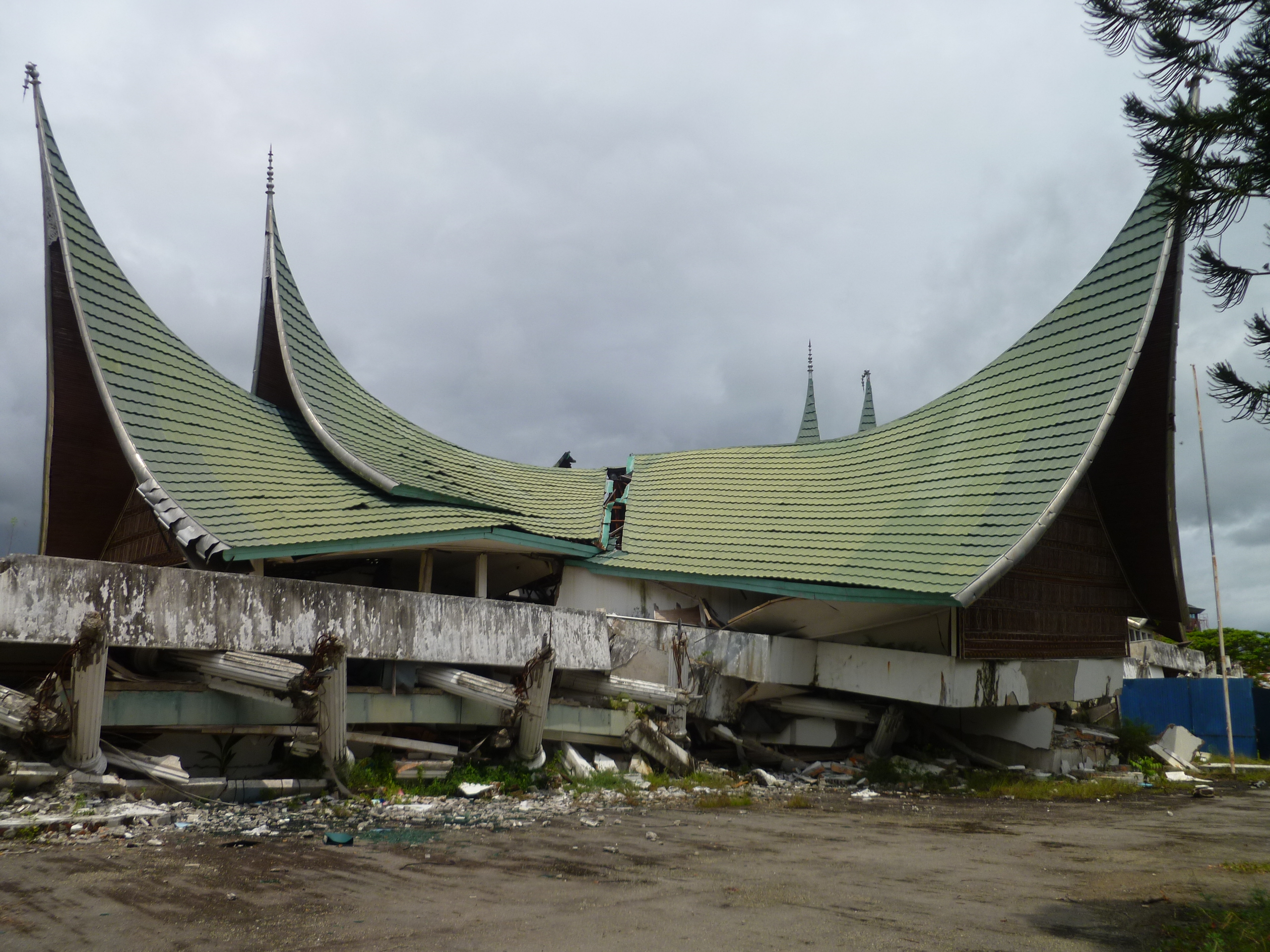
- A government building damaged by the earthquake

- Location within Sumatra Location within Indonesia
- UTC time: 2009-09-30 10:16:10
- ISC event: 13801688
- USGS-ANSS: ComCat
- Local date: 30 September 2009
- Local time: 17:16:10 WIB
- Magnitude: 7.6 M_{w}
- Depth: 90 km (56 mi)
- Epicenter: 0.71°S 99.97°E
- Type: Reverse
- Areas affected: West Sumatra
- Max. intensity: MMI VII (Very strong)
- Tsunami: 27 cm (11 in)
- Landslides: Yes
- Casualties: 1,115 dead 2,180 injured

Two earthquakes occurred in late 2009 off the coast of Sumatra, Indonesia. The first, on 30 September, had a moment magnitude of 7.6 at 17:16:10 local time. The epicenter was 45 kilometres (28 mi) west-northwest of Padang, West Sumatra, and 220 kilometres (140 mi) southwest of Pekanbaru, Riau. Government and authorities confirmed 1,115 dead, 1,214 severely injured and 1,688 slightly injured. The most deaths occurred in the areas of Padang Pariaman (675), Padang (313), Agam (80) and Pariaman (37). In addition, around 135,000 houses were severely damaged, 65,000 houses were moderately damaged and 79,000 houses were slightly damaged. An estimated 250,000 families (1,250,000 people) have been affected by the earthquake through the total or partial loss of their homes and livelihoods.

== Tectonic setting ==
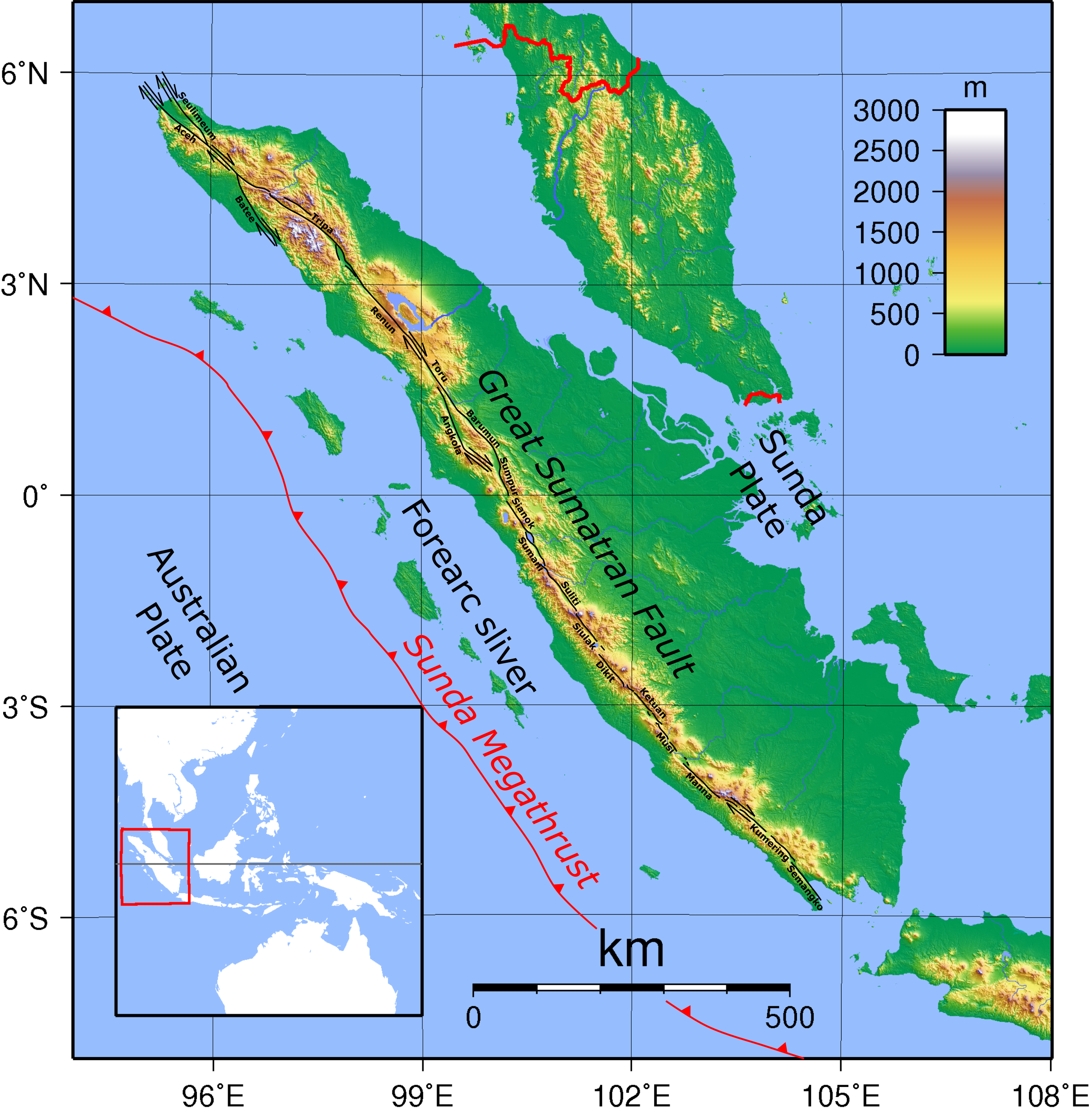
Map of the Sunda megathrust and Great Sumatra fault in Sumatra

Many of Indonesia's islands, including Sumatra, are situated within a zone of high seismic activity known as the Ring of Fire. Along the Sunda megathrust, the Indo-Australian plate is being subducted beneath the Eurasian plate. The subduction creates regular earthquakes, many of them of megathrust type. Specifically the Sumatran segment is currently experiencing a period of increased activity that began with the catastrophic 2004 Indian Ocean earthquake. Each earthquake of the sequence adds additional stresses to segments of the plate boundary that have not moved recently.

== Earthquakes ==
Because of its depth and the computed focal mechanism, the first earthquake is thought to have resulted from deformation within the mantle of the descending Australian plate, rather than from movement on the plate boundary itself. A second event, which measured 6.6 M_{w}, struck the province of Jambi in central Sumatra, 08:52:29 local time on 1 October 2009 at a depth of 15 kilometres (9.3 mi), about 46 kilometres south-east of Sungaipenuh. Although it was in the same region, the United States Geological Survey specified that it was not an aftershock, as it was located too far from the initial quake. The second earthquake has been linked to dextral (right-lateral) movement on the Great Sumatran fault, which takes up the strike-slip component of the convergence between the two plates.

== Effects ==
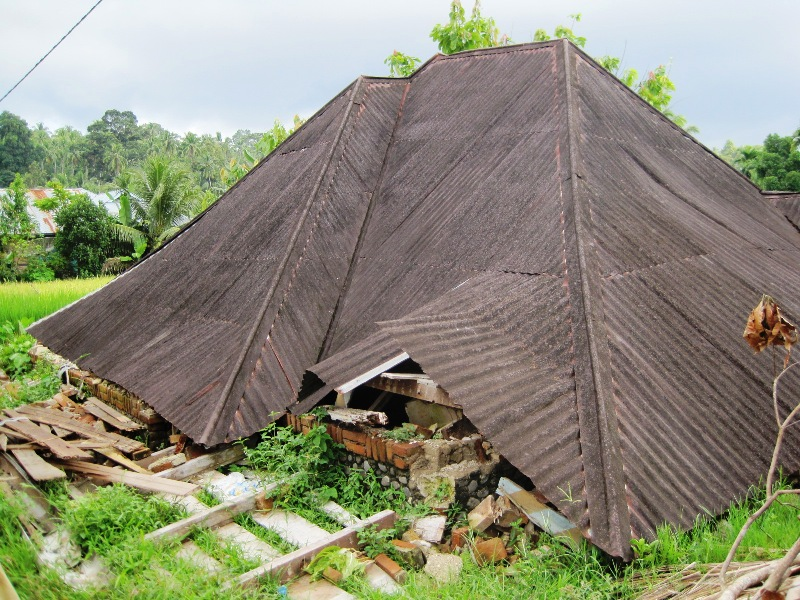
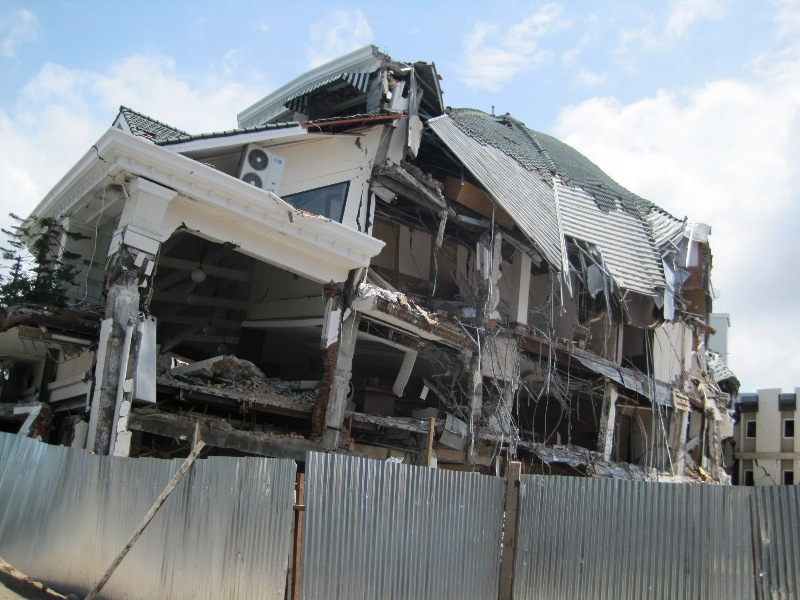
A destroyed house in Padang Pariaman (left) and the 6-story Ambacang Hotel

Tremors from the first earthquake were felt in the Indonesian capital, Jakarta, Malaysia and Singapore. The management of some high-rise buildings in Singapore evacuated their staff.

A tsunami watch was triggered and there was reports of house damage and fires. Hotels in Padang were destroyed, and communications to the city were disrupted.

Local news channel Metro TV reported fires in Padang where residents had run onto the streets as the first quake hit. Teams of rescuers from nearby branches of the National Search and Rescue Agency were deployed to Padang. It was also reported that some water pipes in Padang were broken and there was flooding in the street. There were reports that at least two hospitals and several schools collapsed.

There were landslides and collateral debris flows in the hills surrounding Lake Maninjau. The landslide in Gunung Nan Tigo, Padang Pariaman district completely destroyed some villages and caused many fatalities. Landslides also forced some roads to be closed.

Padang's Minangkabau International Airport suffered minor damage, with parts of the ceiling in the boarding area falling down. The airport reopened on 1 October.

== Response ==
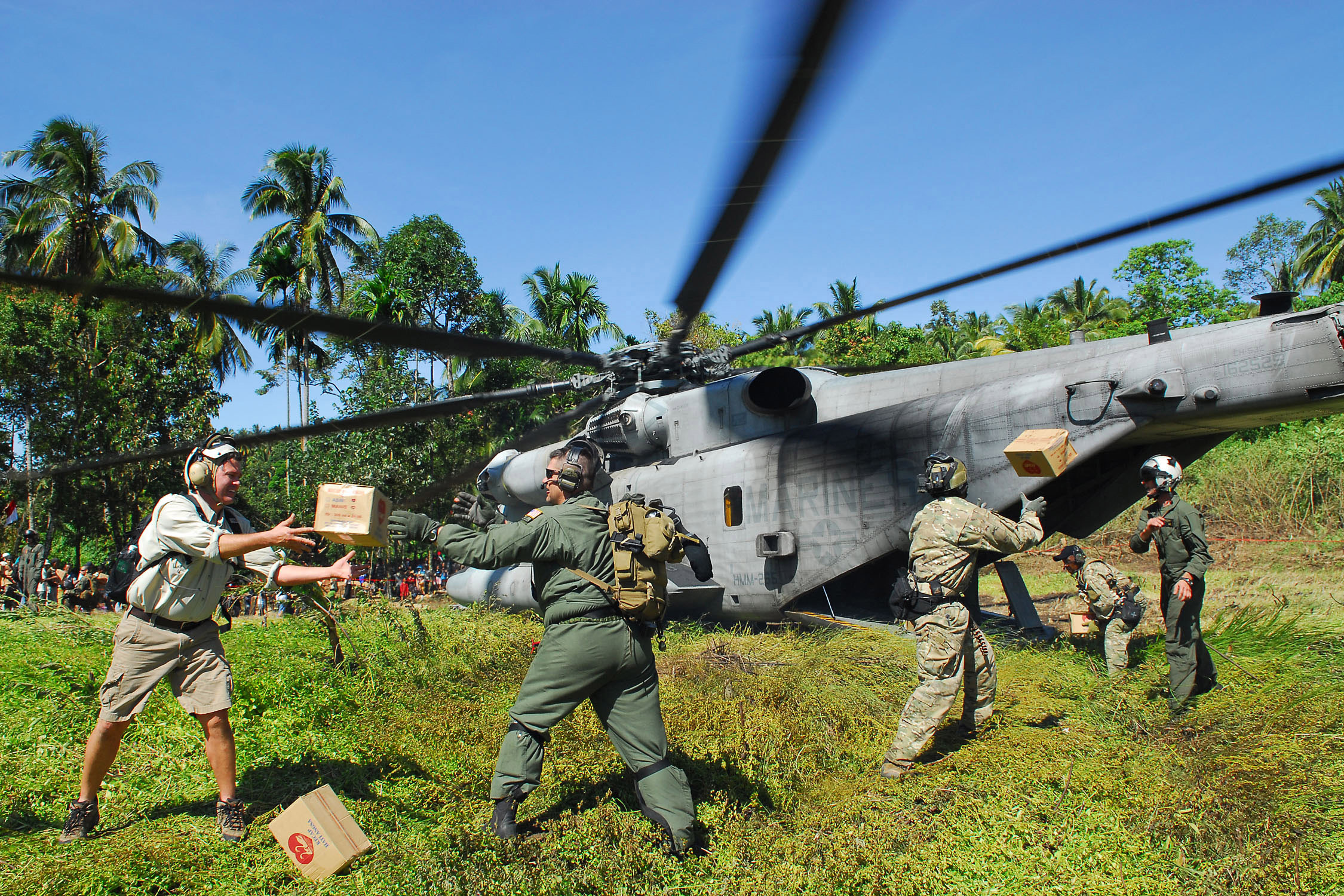
U.S. airmen and Marines unload relief supplies in Padang

Authorities announced that several disaster management teams were en route to Padang although it took several hours for them to reach more remote areas. Rescue workers pulled dozens of survivors from the rubble and rushed them to Djamil Hospital. The hospital itself was overwhelmed with patients, and many patients were treated in tents set up outside the hospital. A man was trapped beneath a flattened hotel for 25 hours with a broken leg before rescue workers pulled him free. The Indonesian military deployed emergency response teams with earth moving equipment to help move rubble and recover trapped victims. Rescue workers and volunteers searched the rubble of a collapsed three-story concrete building, rescuing survivors and recovering bodies while parents of students trapped inside waited nearby. Indonesian villagers used their bare hands to sift through ruins and try to find survivors. On 5 October, Indonesian rescue workers called off their search for trapped survivors and increased efforts to recover bodies, clear rubble, and provide aid to survivors. Indonesian authorities used helicopters to airdrop food and blankets into remote areas, and to bring the wounded from these areas to hospitals.

World Vision, Oxfam, IFRC, Muslim Charity and Mercy Corps confirmed that they would fly their emergency response teams to the devastated Padang area for rapid assessment of the catastrophe. The Red Cross sought donations to help cover earthquake relief costs. World Vision also airlifted 2,000 collapsible water containers and distributed them immediately to the area most affected by earthquake. Additionally World Vision launched US$1 million appeal for the relief effort.

Countries that sent aid

Below is the table of countries that sent or pledged aid for Indonesia

| Australia | Australia sent a team of 10 army engineers, a 36-member civilian search and rescue team, and HMAS Kanimbla, a Royal Australian Navy ship equipped with a hospital and a helicopter. A 36-person urban search and rescue team and about 20 Australian Defence Force medics and engineers arrived in Padang on 3 October. Australia also provided A$250,000 to Indonesian NGO Muhammadiyah to support its medical teams and humanitarian operations and A$100,000 to the Indonesian Red Cross for its emergency response. |
| China | China provided emergency aid worth $500,000. China's Red Cross also provided $50,000 |
| Denmark | Denmark sent a six-man crew and emergency supplies. |
| Estonia | Estonia provided an information technology expert to Indonesia along with the UN Disaster Assessment and Co-ordination (UNDAC) team. The Foreign Ministry also decided to support victims of the earthquake in Indonesia with 1,000,000 kroons. |
| European Union | The EU provided emergency aid worth 3 million euros. |
| Germany | Germany sent emergency aid worth 1 million euros. |
| Hong Kong | HKD 4 million was channeled through World Vision Hong Kong. |
| Ireland | Noel Wardick, Head of the Irish Red Cross International Dept, went to Indonesia on 2 October. Irish Red Cross volunteers worked to rescue people and provide food, clean water, and shelter. |
| Japan | Japan sent a team of 60 search and rescue workers and 23 medical personnel. It also provided emergency goods such as tents, sleeping mats, blankets, and power generators. A Japanese medical team of 23 doctors arrived in Pariaman on 3 October. |
| Malaysia | Mercy Malaysia deployed a two-member team to Padang on 1 October to conduct an on-the-ground assessment to determine the humanitarian needs. An initial total of RM 100,000 was allocated from the emergency fund to respond to the disaster. Malaysian Red Crescent Society deployed a five-member Regional Disaster Response Team consisting of one doctor, one nurse, and relief officers to Padang to provide emergency relief to the earthquake victims on 2 October. The State Government of Selangor allocated RM 500,000 for relief efforts in Padang. Mercy Malaysia deployed a team consisting of an orthopaedic surgeon, a general surgeon, an anesthetist, general practitioners (GPs), and nurses on 4 October to treat the earthquake victims in and around Pariaman which is located some 80 km north of Padang, Sumatra. The team brought along surgical sets and primary healthcare kits worth a total of RM 100,000. 39 members of the Malaysian Search and Rescue Team (Smart) traveled to Padang to assist with the search and rescue of victims who were trapped under rubble following the 7.6-magnitude earthquake. A medical team of 17 officers from the Malaysian Armed Forces medical corps, 8 officers from Malaysian Health Ministry, 2 officers from the National Security Division, and NGO Mercy Malaysia were sent to the capital of West Sumatra. Universiti Teknologi Malaysia in Iskandar Puteri sent 14 volunteers to Padang to help with the humanitarian relief efforts. In a statement, Deputy vice-chancellor Prof Dr. Mohd Azrai Kassim said the team of students and staff from the university would help to provide fresh water supplies. |
| Netherlands | The Netherlands provided 500,000 euros in emergency aid. |
| Norway | Norway pledged a total of NOK 20,000,000 for emergency relief efforts. |
| Qatar | Qatar sent an aircraft, a search and rescue team, and logistical supplies. |
| Russia | Russia sent two aircraft, logistical supplies, medical supplies, doctors, nurses, and a search and rescue team with sniffer dogs. |
| Saudi Arabia | The Kingdom of Saudi Arabia sent a maximus Aircargo plane carrying two units of trucks, one ambulance disaster response unit, a search and rescue team, medicines, and four sniffer dogs to help identify the presence of both survivors and victims under the collapsed buildings in West Sumatra. |
| Singapore | Singapore pledged $50,000 worth of emergency relief supplies, including temporary shelters, blankets, and medicine. They also sent a 54-member medical team from the Singapore Armed Forces, 42-member Civil Defense Force search, rescue contingent, and three helicopters. |
| South Korea | South Korea sent a 43-person search and rescue team and $500,000 in aid. |
| Switzerland | Switzerland sent a search and rescue team. |
| Taiwan | Taiwan donated $150,000 to the effort. |
| Thailand | Thailand sent a plane on 3 October with relief supplies worth $170,000 to Jakarta. |
| Turkey | Turkish Red Crescent appointed an ad hoc representative to the Coordination Center operated by Indonesian Red Cross. |
| United Arab Emirates | The United Arab Emirates sent a 56-member search and rescue team, medical supplies, and heavy equipment. |
| United Kingdom | The UK sent humanitarian experts to help assess the damage. The Department for International Development (DfID) team carried UK aid agency staff and rescue equipment including plastic sheeting, medical supplies, and water purifying equipment. The search and rescue team was made up of 65 firefighters. 10 volunteers from the International Rescue Corps, based in Grangemouth, Stirlingshire, also flew to Sumatra. They took specialized equipment including listening devices and camera systems which can penetrate rubble to search for trapped survivors in collapsed buildings. SARAID (Search and Rescue Assistance in Disasters), a Southwest-based charity, mobilized a team of 10 personnel and sent over a ton of technical equipment to Padang. Gloucester-based search and rescue specialists, Rapid-UK, sent a 16-person team to the area. |
| United States | The US provided emergency aid worth $3 million. They also pledged an additional $3 million, and provided an Air Force C-130 Hercules transport aircraft, Navy C-12 transport aircraft and crew. The USS Denver and the USS McCampbell were sent to assist. Eight U.S. Navy and Marine Corps helicopters from these ships delivered more than 360,000 pounds of food, water and emergency shelter supplies from disaster relief NGOs to remote regions inaccessible by land. These helicopters also flew government and NGO survey teams to conduct assessments of hard-hit areas. Indonesian military and U.S. Air Force doctors, along with Navy corpsmen, treated more than 2,000 patients at an Air Force humanitarian assistance rapid response team field hospital set up in Padang; small teams of U.S. and Indonesian medical personnel also embarked helicopters and made medical visits to a handful of remote villages, transporting injured persons back to Padang for treatment. |

== See also ==
- List of earthquakes in 2009
- List of earthquakes in Indonesia
