= Stockline Plastics factory explosion =

2004 industrial disaster in Glasgow, Scotland

Coordinates: 55.8755°N 4.2685°W

On 11 May 2004, the ICL Plastics factory (commonly referred to as Stockline Plastics factory), in the Woodside district of Maryhill, Glasgow in western Scotland, exploded. Nine people were killed, including two company directors, and 33 injured, 15 of them seriously. The four-storey building was largely destroyed.

== Response ==
Approximately 100 people worked in the four-storey building. At midday BST (11:00 UTC), an explosion occurred and the building collapsed instantly.

The first service to arrive at the site were a Patient Transport Ambulance crew who took the decision to divert straight to the scene because they were so close at the time of the explosion. This initial crew saved dozens of lives by taking control of the evacuation and pulling the injured to safety. Around a dozen people were trapped in the rubble. Fire crews used specialist search-and-rescue equipment, including sniffer dogs, carbon dioxide detectors (which detect the respired carbon dioxide of trapped persons), thermal-imaging equipment, and fibre-optic cameras to search for people trapped in the collapsed building. Some trapped workers were able to make themselves heard by shouting, or by using their mobile phones. Fire and Ambulance crews pulled seven people alive from the rubble on 11 May. The search through the factory's ruins continued for the following three days.

Up to 300 firefighters and paramedics were present at the scene and were supported by, the crew of a Sea King rescue helicopter from RAF Leconfield, North Yorkshire, and a sniffer dog team from RAF Waddington, Lincolnshire. The volunteer group International Rescue Corps, who specialise in travelling to the site of earthquakes and helping locate survivors, sent eleven of its Scottish members to the scene.

The injured were taken for treatment to five hospitals in Glasgow; the most patients were taken to Stobhill Hospital, Western Infirmary and Glasgow Royal Infirmary, and the remaining were treated at Southern General and Victoria Infirmary. Seven people were declared dead at the scene, and two died in Western Infirmary. One firefighter was taken to hospital after being overcome by fumes, and several were stricken by heat exhaustion while labouring in the hot and humid conditions.

By the end of the second day, seven deaths had been declared. After the fourth day, Strathclyde Police had named the deceased as Annette Doyle (32), Peter Ferguson (52), Thomas McAulay (41), Tracey McErlane (27), Ann Trench (34), company directors Stewart McColl (60) and Margaret Brownlie (49), Kenneth Ronald Murray, (45), and Timothy Smith (31). With the recovery of Mr. Smith's body from the site on 14 May, Strathclyde Fire Brigade announced that they believed no hope of recovering live victims remained.

== Cause ==
Ten weeks after the explosion, the site was returned to the owners, after tonnes of debris were removed from the site for detailed examination.

The cause of the explosion was initially unknown. Some press coverage reported eyewitness accounts of gas industrial ovens in the coating department exploding. This has since been shown as unlikely as the gas ovens used on site have been found intact.

Another theory investigated by the Health and Safety Executive (HSE) was that there was no explosion. An article in The Scotsman newspaper of 5 October 2004 stated that the HSE was investigating the possibility that heavy machinery and pallets kept on the upper floors caused the floor to collapse, bringing the rest of the building down with it.

Other theories included a dust explosion and a build-up of methane beneath the building.

However the final report of the HSE indicated that the explosion was due to an ignition of gas released by a leak in a pressurised petroleum gas pipe.

The liquefied petroleum gas (LPG) tank and pipes that had been installed beneath the factory in the late 1960s had corroded, allowing the gas to escape.

== Confusion over name ==
Although regularly referred to as the "Stockline Plastics factory", largely due to the signage around the building (the "name over the door"), the factory was owned by ICL Plastics and much of the work that took place there was for ICL Tech (part of the same group of companies). The offices on the floors above were used by ICL Plastics, ICL Tech (formerly ICL Technical Plastics), and Stockline Plastics.

Stockline Plastics is a distribution company that is part of the same group of companies, and did not operate the factory.

== Aftermath ==
The Grovepark Fund, established to help the families of those killed and injured in the blast, received a boost when the departing Celtic F.C. star, Henrik Larsson, announced that the shirt he wore in his farewell match against Seville on Tuesday would be auctioned in aid of the appeal. It was expected to attract bids of up to £10,000. It eventually sold for £1400.

A memorial service took place in the Glasgow Royal Concert Hall on 4 July 2004. Another was held at Community Central Hall on 11 May 2005, one year on from the tragic event.

== Prosecution ==
The Crown Office decided on 17 February to prosecute ICL Plastics Limited and ICL Tech Limited under the Health & Safety at Work Act following a report conducted by the Glasgow Procurator Fiscal and HSE.

The company was accused of:

- Failing to maintain pipes carrying hazardous gas;
- Failure to ensure the safety of staff and visitors; and
- Failing to carry out suitable and sufficient risk assessments.

The original hearing date of 12 December 2006 was postponed as "The timescale that the defence solicitors have been afforded for their preparation of the case has been significantly less [than the Procurator Fiscal's]".

The trial, which began on 13 August 2007, concluded on 17 August 2007, with the operators ICL Tech Ltd and ICL Plastics admitting to four charges in court.

On 28 August 2007 a fine of £200,000 was imposed on each of the two companies responsible (ICL Plastics Limited and ICL Tech Limited).

== Public Inquiry ==
Logo of the inquiry

The ICL Inquiry took place in Maryhill Community Central Hall. It occurred after the criminal proceedings were concluded.

In December 2007, Lord Gill, Lord Justice Clerk was announced as Chair of the inquiry. The inquiry started on 2 July 2008, after extensive refurbishment work was carried out on behalf of the Scottish Courts Service to make the venue suitable for the public inquiry. The Crown, the victims' families, the Health and Safety Executive (HSE) and ICL are all represented. The inquiry examined over 20,000 pages of evidence and took place in two phases. The first was a factual enquiry into what occurred. The second stage, to look at causes and reasons, began in October 2008. The inquiry was chaired by Lord Gill. Roy Martin Q.C., a former Dean of the faculty of Advocates, was lead counsel for the inquiry.

In July 2009, Lord Gill's Report was published. His inquiry cost £1.9 million and was published 13 months after his appointment. It was described favourably in 2024 by the Times as "short, sharp and hard-hitting" in contrast to many subsequent inquiries. In Appendix 4 of the Report Lord Gill set out the chronological process operated by him. In the Preface he stated he did this to assist other inquiries in the future.

As well as being critical of the companies involved, it noted failings by the Health & Safety Executive's supervision and inspection regime. The Report contained various recommendations relating to proper safety protocols concerning the storage and use of liquid petroleum gas.

== Memorial ==
In May 2007, a memorial garden was unveiled.
