= Indra Swara =

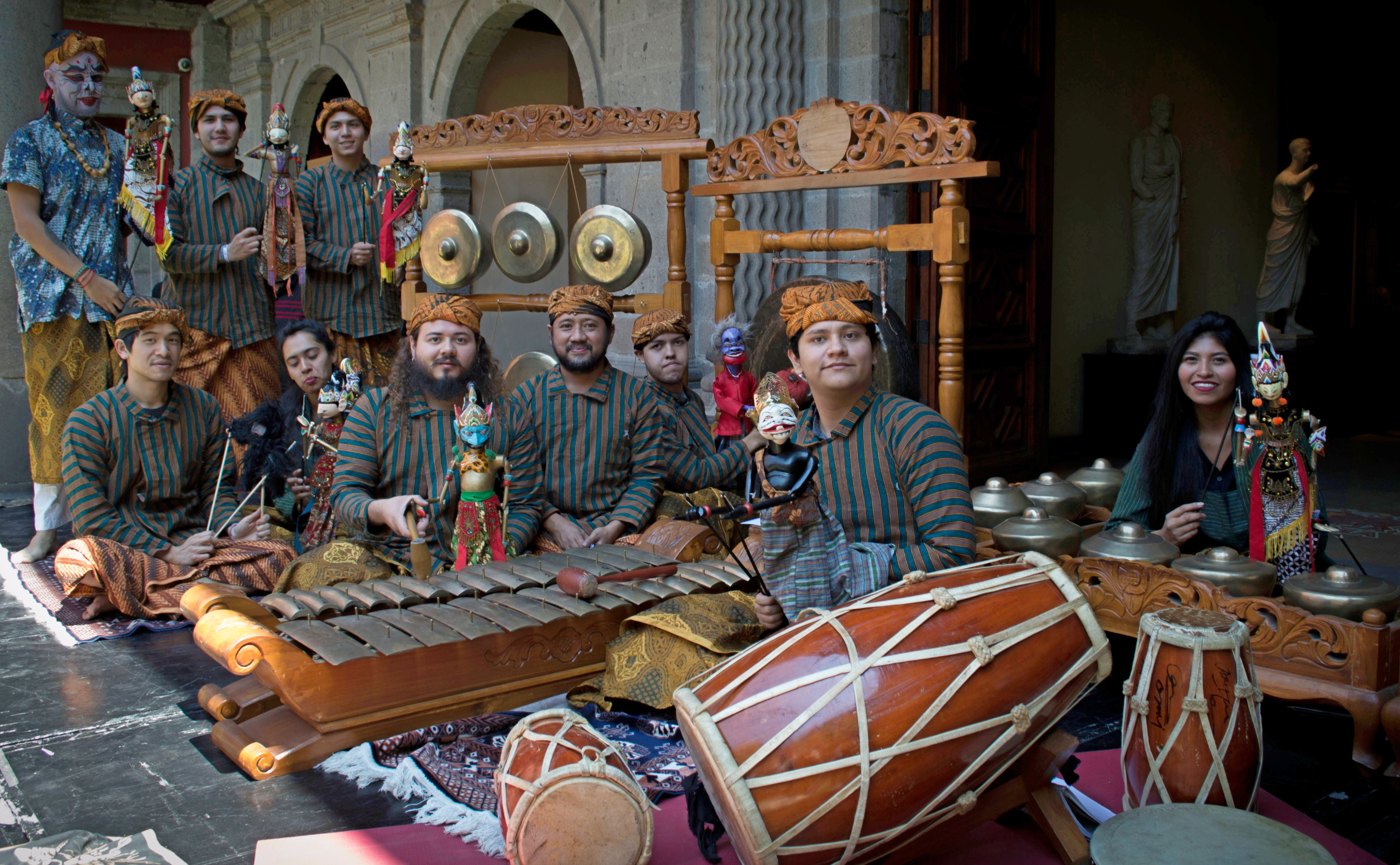
- Indra Swara group, performing at the Museo Nacional de las Culturas Mexico City 2018

Background information
- Origin: Mexico City, Mexico
- Genre: Gamelan
- Years active: 2002–present
- Website: www.indraswara.com

Indra Swara (Gamelan Indra Swara) is a group promoting Indonesian art and culture in Mexico. It was created in December 2002 and it is mostly made up of young Mexicans, enthusiasts of Asian arts and particularly those of Indonesia. Some of its members have had the opportunity to study directly in the islands of Java and Bali through the Darmasiswa Scholarship program offered by the Indonesian government.

== Origins ==
Its foundation dates back to the spring of 2002, when its founder, Fitra Ismu Kusumo had just arrived in Mexico. Seeing that the gamelan of the Indonesian Embassy was not used as such, but was merely a decorative object on display, along with former Darmasiswas Miguel Piñeda and Carolina Malgarego decided to seize the opportunity and use the Javanese slendro owned by the Embassy.

During the summer of that year, other Darmasiswa grantees returned from Indonesia: Ilse Peralta and Shawn Callahan (American). Shawn, Fitra, Miguel, Carolina and Ilse had known each other since 2000 while in Indonesia. Ilse Peralta returns to Mexico with the idea of forming an Indonesian art and culture group which she calls "Majapahit", based on her Balinese dance studies; while Fitra Ismu keeps the concept of gamelan and making use of the gamelan at the Embassy, he invites the music schools in Mexico City (Escuela Nacional de Música, Escuela Superior de Música and Conservatorio Nacional de Música (Mexico), extending this invitation to their students to learn how to play the gamelan together as a group. At that time, Emilio Esteban, Zianya Nandayapa, Iván Flores Morán, Jorge Vazquez, Olinka Flores, Yarandari and other young people joined to learn how to play the gamelan. In that same summer of 2002, the gamelan group Indra Swara was founded at the Indonesian Embassy in Mexico.

== Trajectory ==
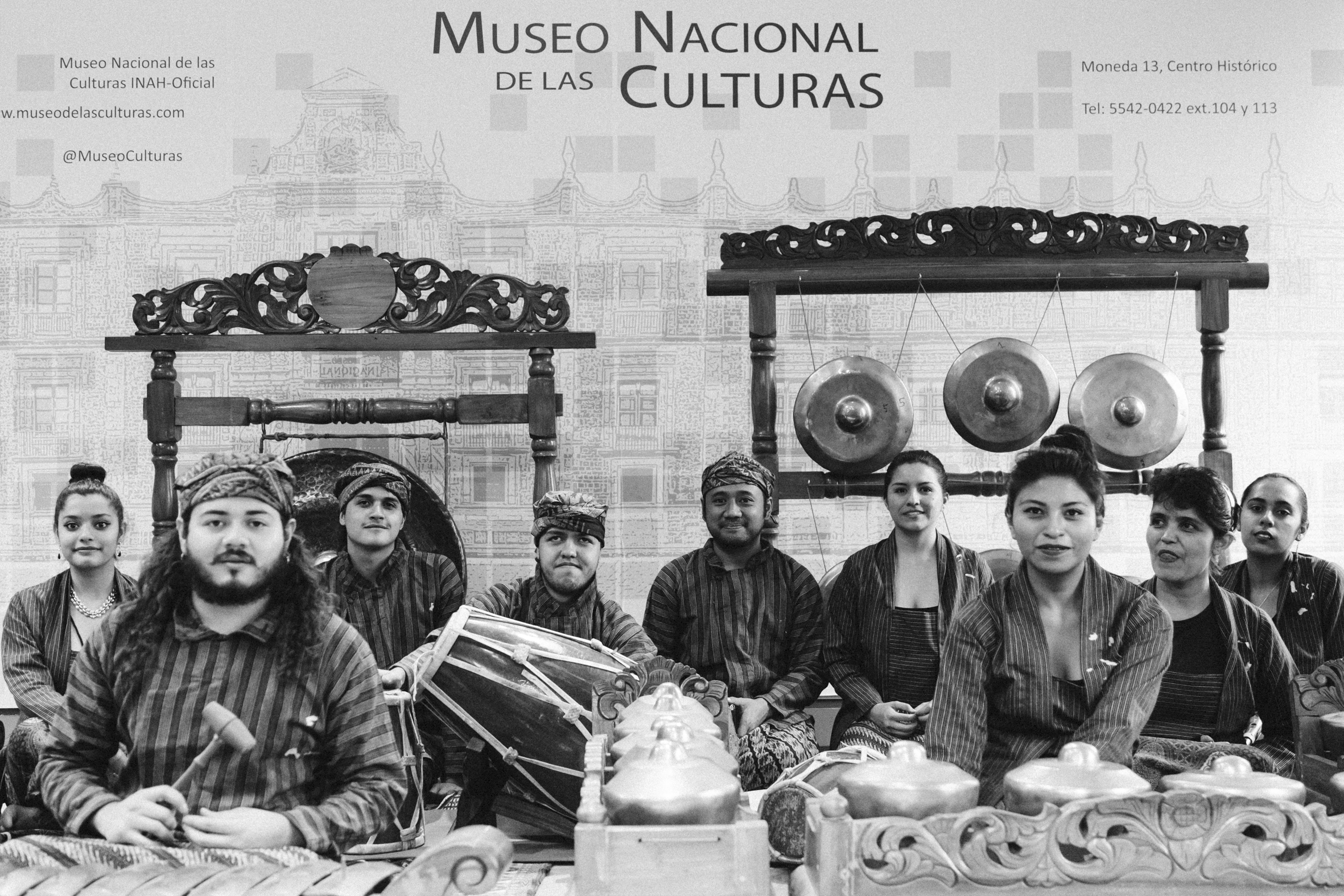
Gamelan group Indra Swara in Mexico.

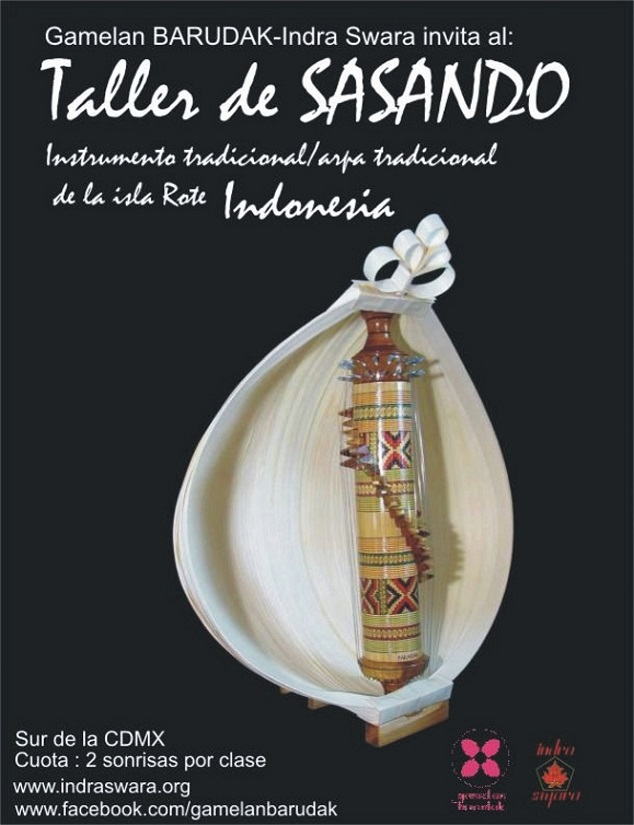
Promoting sasando in Mexico.

The main objective of the group is to provide a space to publicize and promote, in Mexico and its surroundings, the ancient art and culture of Indonesia through a musical group of gamelan orchestra. It was not until 2005 that the group manages to get its own gamelan. Since March 2003 Fitra Ismu manages to raise enough money for the purchase of a gamelan and its freight from Java Indonesia to Mexico City. This is achieved, of course, with the administrative support of the Indonesian Embassy in Mexico, making use of the facilities available to its diplomatic corps.

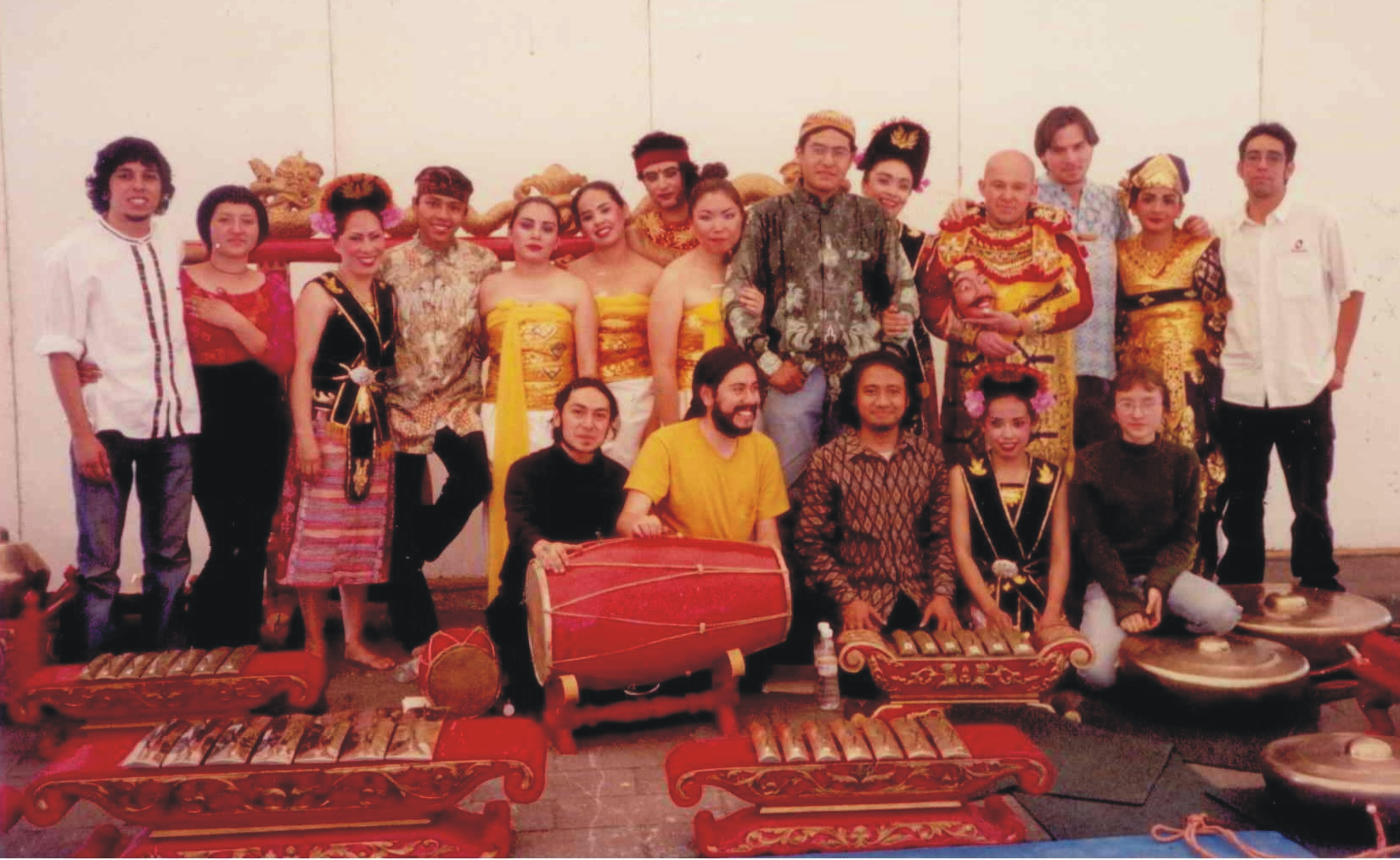
Gamelan group Indra Swara in Mexico 2003

In February 2007 under the direction of Emilio Esteban, the group managed to release its first album, which was considered a great achievement for the group. Likewise, performances including both music and sendra tari (theater with gamelan and traditional dance) were staged with the unconditional support of Camilo García and Katherine Ziggler (Kate Asmara), both former Darmasiswas for the period 2004-2008.

Between the winter of 2009 and the spring of 2011, under the coordination of Fitra Ismu, the Javanese gamelan instruments were taught in a music school; this was done at the Centro Cultural Ollin Yoliztli, and the opportunity was provided by one of the Center's directors, Mr. Francisco Becerra Maza. Those who taught the gamelan classes were Esteban Gonzales, Huitzilin Sanchez and Fitra Ismu, borrowing the Surakartan style pelog slendro Javanese gamelan from the Indonesian embassy in Mexico. The gamelan teaching program at this school had to be stopped due to lack of sponsor.

Indra Swara has benefited from the advice of two dance and music teachers: Balinese dancer and ethnomusicologist Bapak I Nyoman Wenten and Javanese ethnomusicologist Bapak Joko Walujo, both masters of Indonesian art at the California Institute of the Arts (CALARTS) in Los Angeles, California. In 2003, 2005 and 2014 they visited Mexico to teach short courses and give presentations. Likewise, Jody Diamond, composer and artist in residence at Harvard University has visited Mexico to give gamelan courses. As regards traditional dance, the group has had the advice of teacher Irawati Durban Ardjo, specialist in the Sundanese style (West Java), who visited Mexico in 2005.

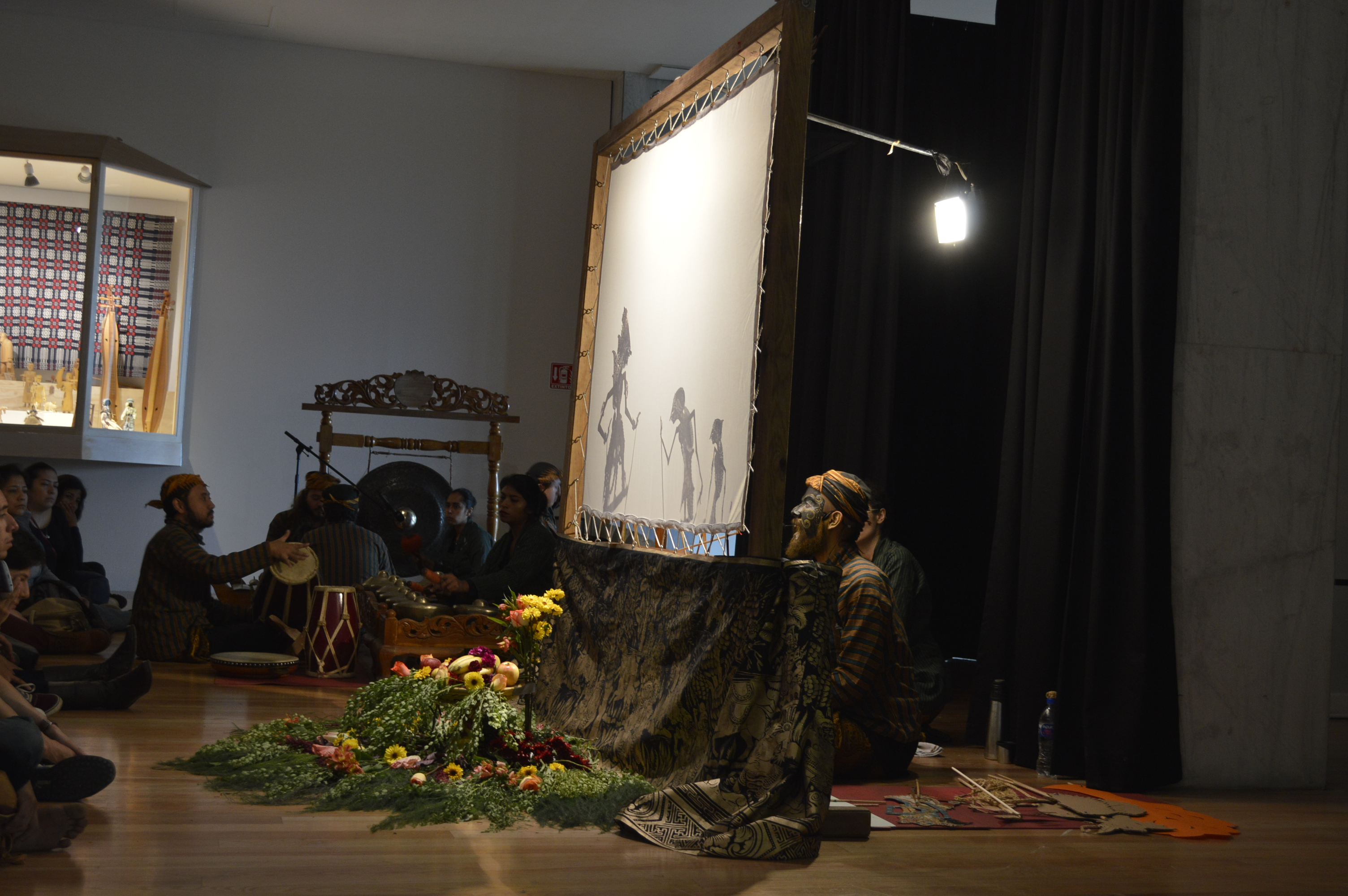
Wayang kulit Indra Swara in Spanish language

In 2014 the Indra Swara Group forms a new division that includes its gamelan degung set which it calls Gamelan Barudak, since a team member, Daniel Milán, returns to Mexico in 2014 after almost 5 years of learning the art of gamelan degung in West Java, Indonesia. In that same year, the first Indonesian shadow puppet play (wayang kulit) was also presented and the special division for presenting puppet plays was created. Since then, Indra Swara has been expanding, and in addition to promoting the gamelan / music and dance (which had been doing before), also begins to promote the art of Indonesian puppets.

In 2015 the Mexican percussionist group Tambuco, with 4 Grammy Award nominations, borrowed the gamelan from Indra Swara (its degung Barudak gamelan ensemble) to present the work of Lou Harrison "Threnody for Carlos Chávez" within the framework of the Historic Center Festival in Mexico City during the spring of 2015, for the same reason that at that time it was the only set of gamelan degung in Latin America.

Likewise, a very famous jazz group from Indonesia, Krakatau, during its visit to participate in the 2008 Festival Internacional Cervantino in Guanajuato, through its director, Dwiki Dharmawan, gave Indra Swara several traditional Indonesian instruments. In 2012 the group of musicians from the Mangkunegaran Palace court also visited Mexico for their participation in the 2012 Cervantino Festival and the musicians presented Indra Swara with various shadow puppets, fabrics and equipment for shadow puppet presentations (Wayang kulit).

In 2003, Fitra Ismu began working at the Indonesian Embassy in Mexico as an assistant to the cultural attaché of that diplomatic corps, which greatly facilitated the movement of the group especially to seek and hold events with the support of the Embassy as part of the country's cultural promotion strategy in Mexico. In 2004 Emilio Esteban returned from Indonesia (after having left with the Darmasiswa scholarship program) and in 2005 the gamelan pelog instruments belonging to the group arrived from Indonesia. A regeneration of the group took place, in which Emilio Esteban became director of the group (2005-2013) and Fitra Ismu remained as founder and, using his position in the Embassy (where he worked until 2012) he also serves as promoter for the group (from 2005 to date).

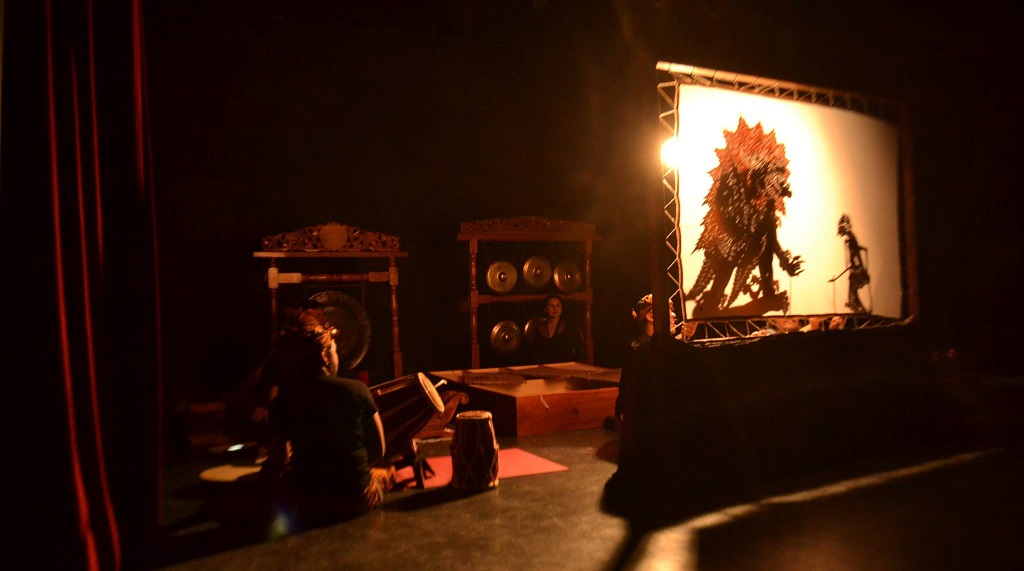
Gamelan Barudak Indra Swara

Indra Swara's directors
Number	Director	From	To
1	Fitra Ismu Kusumo	August 2002	August 2005
2	Emilio Esteban Gonzáles Alfonzo	August 2005	July 2013
3	Luis Alberto León Santillan	July 2013	July 2014
4	Tomasz Matlingiewicz (artistic dir.)	Oct. 2013	April 2014
5	Lourdes Noemí Nava Jiménez	July 2014	March 27, 2015
6	Fitra Ismu Kusumo	March 27, 2015	to date
7	Brandon Hubert Yu (artistic dir.)	August 17, 2017	to date

== Divisions and group conformation ==
Indra swara originated with a Javanese slendro Javanese gamelan set from Indonesia, and since 2002 and over time it has been acquiring more materials from Indonesia with the main idea of promoting Indonesia in Mexico and amongst Spanish speakers. Since its foundation, Indra Swara has acquired several traditional Indonesian instruments such as Hasapi, gendang melayu/Kendang, various types of flutes/suling, Rebab, Kacapi and some Sasando. Currently, the divisions (conformation) of the group are:

- the Pelog Javanese Gamelan Humo del Tiempo (Gamelan Nyi Asep Mangsa), Grup: Purba Kawitan
- Gamelan Barudak Grup: Gamelan Barudak

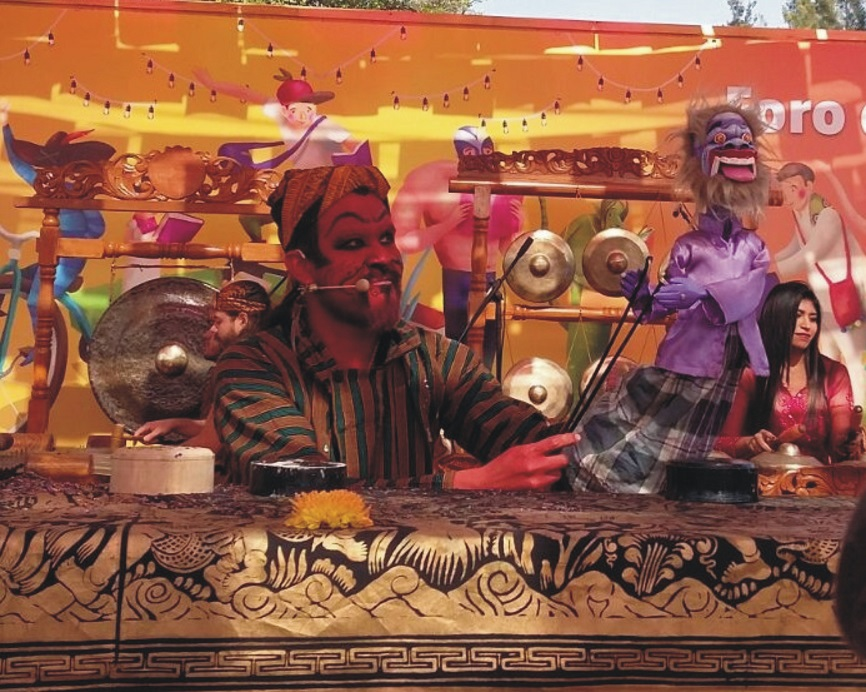
Wayang golek Indra Swara in Spanish language, Feria Internacional del Libro Infantil y Juvenil 2017.

Indra Swara started to acquire puppets since 2007, and by 2010 it was possible for them to buy a box of Javanese shadow puppets containing 180 characters; although this box is still in Indonesia due to lack of funds to bring it to Mexico. Since 2014, the gamelan and dance music presentations have been expanded to incorporate Indonesian puppet art, both shadow puppets (Wayang kulit) and wooden puppets (Wayang golek). This strategy has been effective because since 2014 Mexicans have had the opportunity to learn more about Indonesia through these puppet shows, and in addition, this has given the group more opportunities to present themselves in front of the public. Indra Swara intends to create more divisions and concepts of art presentation, since more and more innovation and creativity is required to promote the art and culture of Indonesia in the Spanish-speaking world. One of the efforts of the Indra Swara group to promote the Indonesian art of puppetry has been through the donation of several puppets to the puppet museums of Mexico, such as the Puppet History Museum in Estado de Mexico and the Casa del Títere Museum in Puebla. In addition, Fitra Ismu, during the period 2005-2007, had already served as facilitator for donations made by the Indonesian Embassy in Mexico to several institutions in Mexico, including the National Museum of Cultures in Mexico City.

== Books ==
The following books (written by Fitra Ismu using his own versions of the traditional stories) are used as material that serves as the basis for the group’s puppet shows or storytelling performances:

- Flor de Humildad (Javanese history of the Ramayana)
- La Bufanda Roja-Cuentos Folkloricos de Indonesia (Folkloric Tales of Indonesia)

== TV reports ==
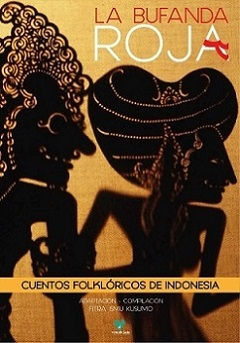
Cuentos folclóricos de Indonesia

1. Purnamasari, Febi (2014). "Grup Promosi Indonesia Indra Swara". Muslim Traveler (in Indonesian). NETMEDIA Indonesia.
2. Sánchez, Karla Iberia (2014). "Titere de Sombras de Indonesia". Noticieros Televisa (in Spanish). TELEVISA.
3. Lopez, Edith (2014). "Presentan obras épicas de Indonesia con teatro de sombras". Cultura (in Spanish). Sistema de Noticias Tlaxcala.
4. Putri, Didie (2017). "TV report 2017 About Mexico, its art tradition and Modern Industry, SI UNYIL Program-on TRANS 7 Indonesia". Laptop Si Unyil. Season Si Unyil keliling Dunia (in Indonesian). TRANSMedia. Trans7.
5. Medina, Rodrigo. "Clip Museo Nacional de las Culturas". Actividades del Museo (in Spanish). Museo Nacional de las Culturas.
6. Lopez, Edith (2014). "Semana de Indonesia en Tlaxcala". Cultura (in Spanish). Sistema de Noticias Tlaxcala.
7. Guzman, Maribel (2016). "Festejan 5to. Aniversario del Museo del Títere en Tepotzotlán". Noticias (in Spanish). Reporte Noticias.
8. Purnamasari, Febi (2014). "Pertunjukan Unik Grup Wayang Meksiko Chipotle Teatro - NET12". Inspirasi-Inspiring Person (in Indonesian). NETMEDIA Indonesia.
9. Novianto, Andi (2019). "Hobby Yang Mendunia". Si UNYIL (in Indonesian). TRANSTV Indonesia.
