= Muslim Charity =

Registered Muslim charity in the United Kingdom

- Logo of Muslim Charity
- Founded: 1999
- Founder: Shaykh Muhammad Imdad Hussain Pirzada
- Type: Organisation
- Registration no.: 1078488
- Purpose: Relief and Development
- Location: England, UK
- Region served: Worldwide
- Website: www.muslimcharity.org.uk

Muslim Charity is an international relief and development non-governmental organization (NGO) that aims to alleviate the suffering of needy and vulnerable communities as well as respond to disasters and emergencies.

== History ==
Muslim Charity is a registered charity in the United Kingdom, charity registration number 1078488. The charity was founded in 1999 by Shaykh Muhammad Imdad Hussain Pirzada. who is recognized as one of the 500 most influential Muslims globally, It was established with the goal of alleviating poverty around the world regardless of race, religion or gender.

== Activities ==
Muslim Charity has provided assistance following natural disasters such as the 2004 Indian Ocean earthquake and tsunami, it provided support through its orphan sponsorship program in connection with Indonesia Nahdalat al-Ulama.

Following the 2005 Pakistan earthquake, Muslim Charity constructed a village, which is now named Al-Karam Village and comprises a school and a mosque. In February 2006, the founder of Muslim Charity, Shaykh Muhammad Imdad Hussain Pirzada visited Pakistan and Kashmir to see the work carried out by Muslim Charity and to officially inaugurate the Al-Karam Village.

In 2009, Muslim Charity developed the Safe Water Project in Pakistan to be implemented in three phases. In August 2009, Muslim Charity launched its Safe Water Campaign to raise $1 million, and targeted to build 50 deep water wells, 300 water hand pumps, 25 overhead storage tanks and 2 water reservoirs.

In 2013, Junaid Jamshed, a organiser of Muslim Charity launched the Honouring Our Mothers campaign to raise funds for obstetric fistula surgeries.

In 2014, Muslim Charity partnered with the UNRWA Gaza Flash Appeal to address the humanitarian emergency in the Gaza Strip. That same year Muslim Charity raised funds for victims of serious flooding in the Midlands and southern England.

In December 2017, Sir Tony Lloyd MP led a delegation to Bangladesh to oversee Muslim Charity's humanitarian work for the Rohingya refugees following the influx of Rohingya refugees in to Cox's Bazar in the preceding year.

In 2019, Muslim Charity supported the creation and support of a school for children of sex workers in Lahore, Pakistan, called Apni Taleem.

In 2021, Muslim Charity conducted its first virtual fundraising event where participants were encouraged to walk, jog or run 30 miles in 30 days to support the charity's Winter Appeal.

In 2022, Muslim Charity partnered with UNRWA to provide 630 Palestinian refugee patients in Gaza with a two-month supply of insulin for Type 1 diabetes. That same year Muslim Charity donated life-saving defibrillators to the communities in two Bassetlaw villages, it also provided commemorative benches marking the Platinum Jubilee which were placed in villages around Bassetlaw to support the local communities.

In 2023, Muslim charity raised more than £30,000 for a campaign to help street children in Bangladesh and Pakistan with collaboration of an Oldham schoolgirl, Hannah. The fundraising was part of Muslim Charity's Street Children Project.

== Awards ==
In 2025, Muslim Charity received the Fundraising Innovation of the Year award at the National Fundraising Awards, organised by the Chartered Institute of Fundraising.

In 2023, 11-year-old Hannah Miah received the Pride of Britain Award for raising more than £30,000 for Muslim Charity’s street children campaign.
