= Music of Asia =

Asian music encompasses numerous musical styles, diverse cultural and religious traditions, and forms originating on the Asian continent.

== Traditions by country ==
Asian musical traditions include:

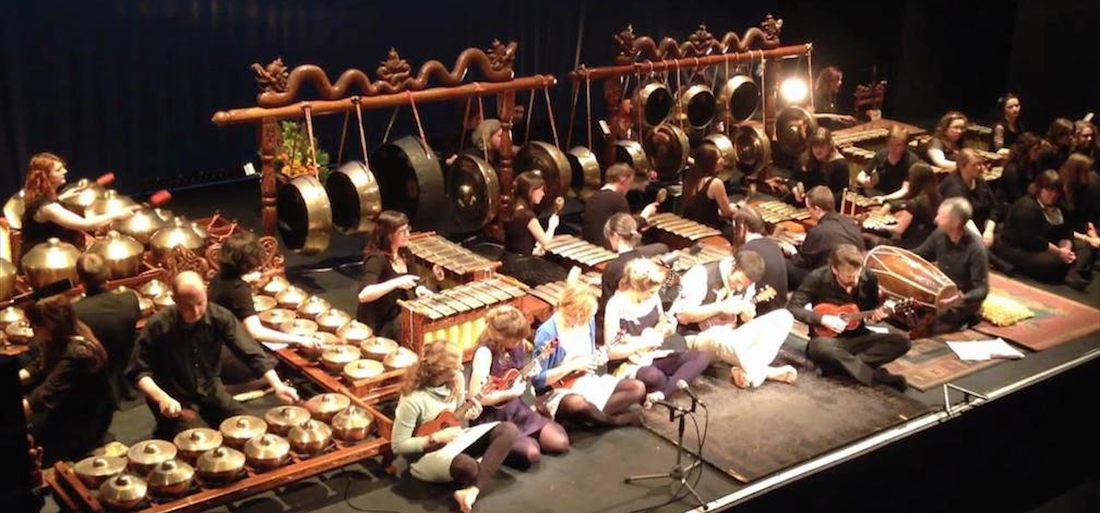
Westerners interested in studying and playing Indonesian Gamelan

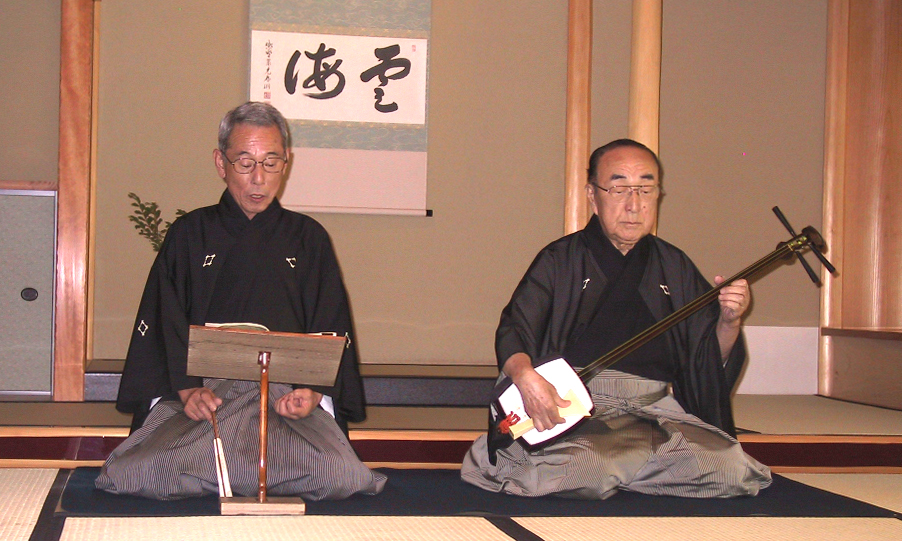
A Japanese man playing a shamisen while another sings

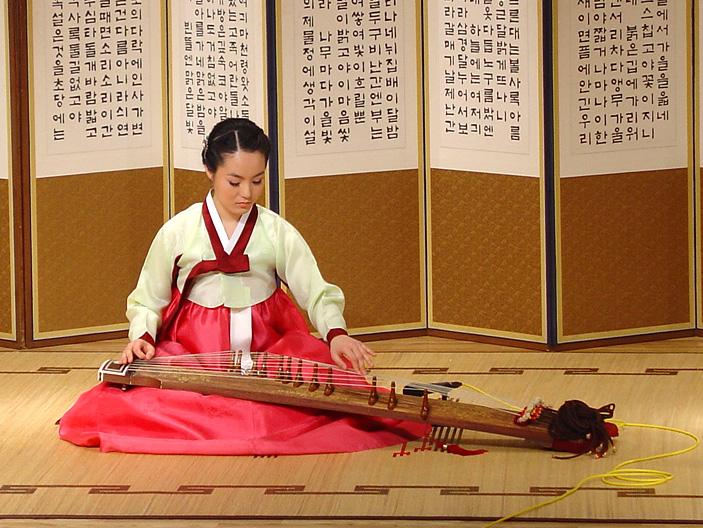
A Korean gayageum performer

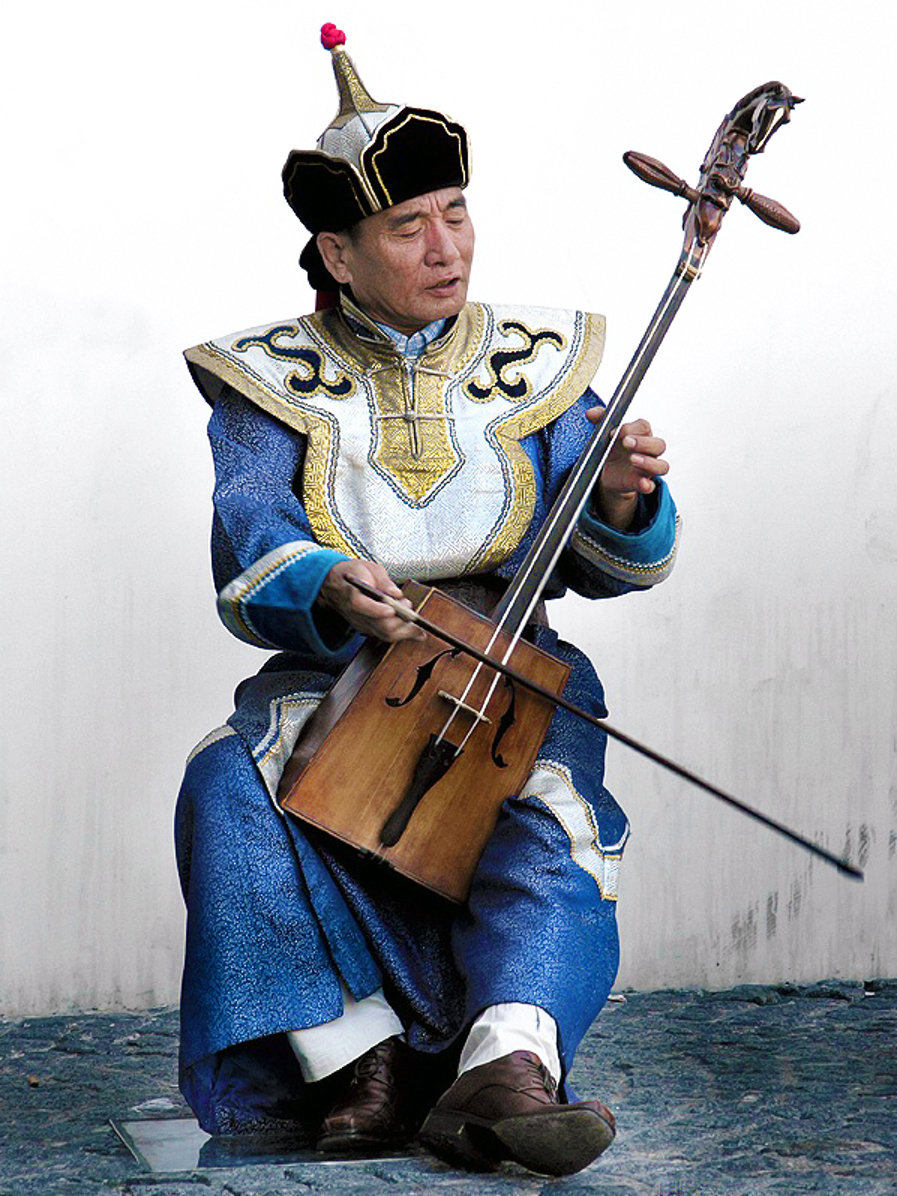
A Mongolian musician

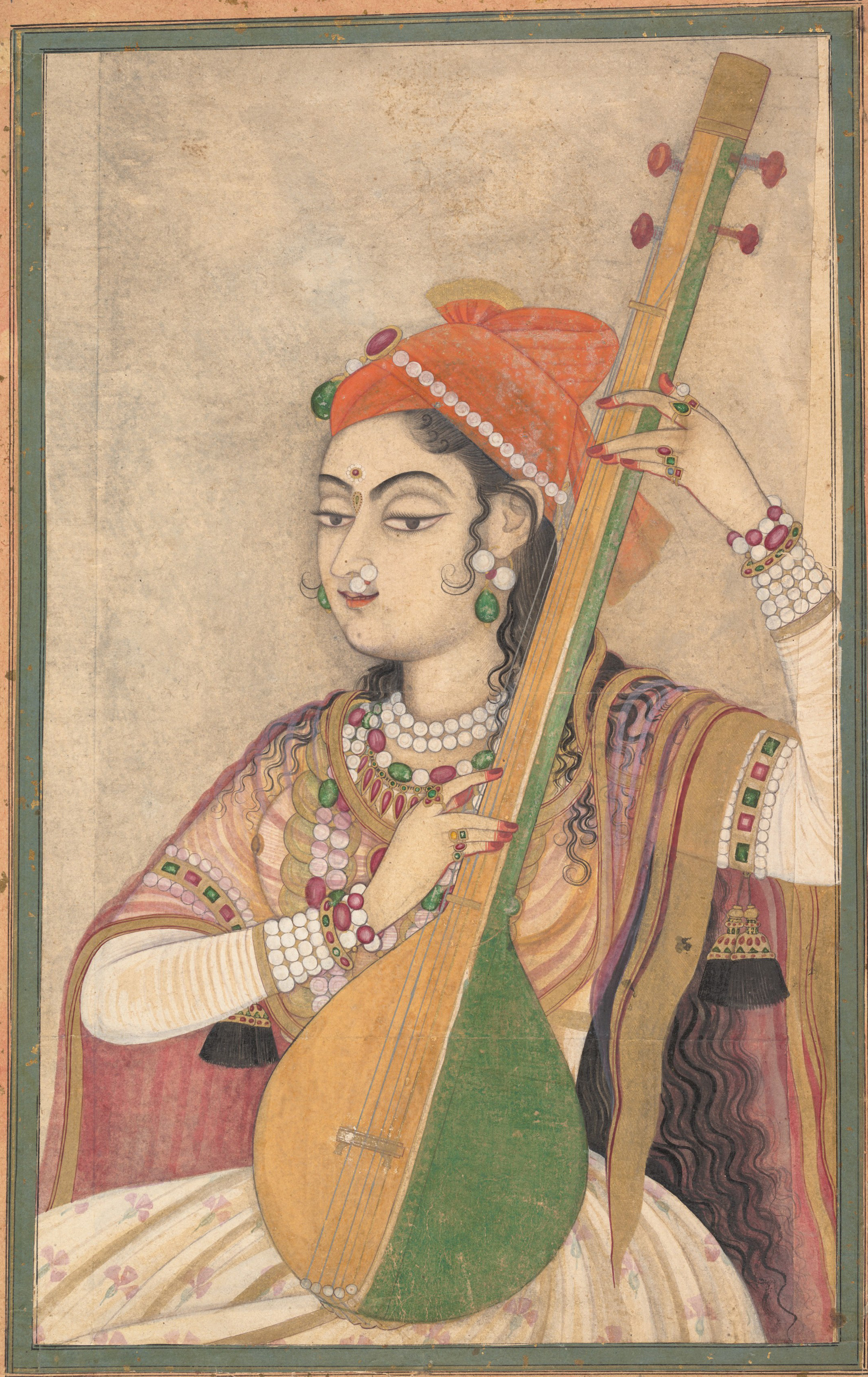
A Lady Playing the Tanpura; Rajasthan

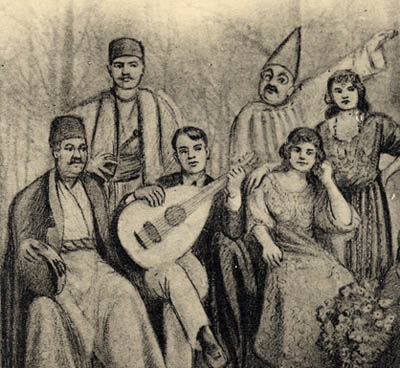
A musical theatre group in Baghdad

- Music of East Asia
  - Music of China
  - Music of Hong Kong
  - Music of Japan
  - Traditional music of Korea
    - Music of North Korea
    - Music of South Korea
  - Music of Macau
  - Music of Mongolia
  - Music of Taiwan
  - Music of Tibet
- Music of Southeast Asia
  - Music of Brunei
  - Music of Cambodia
  - Music of Indonesia
    - Music of Bali
    - Music of Java
    - Music of Sunda
  - Music of Laos
  - Music of Malaysia
  - Music of Myanmar
  - Music of the Philippines
  - Music of Singapore
  - Music of Thailand
  - Music of Timor-Leste
  - Music of Vietnam
- Music of South Asia
  - Music of Afghanistan
  - Music of Bangladesh
  - Music of Bhutan
  - Music of India
  - Music of the Maldives
  - Music of Nepal
  - Music of Pakistan
  - Music of Sri Lanka
- Music of Central Asia
  - Music of Kazakhstan
  - Music of Kyrgyzstan
  - Music of Tajikistan
  - Music of Turkmenistan
  - Music of Uzbekistan
- Music of West Asia (Middle East)
  - Arabic music
    - Music of Bahrain
    - Music of Iraq
    - Music of Jordan
    - Music of Kuwait
    - Music of Lebanon
    - Music of Oman
    - Music of Palestine
    - Music of Qatar
    - Music of Saudi Arabia
    - Music of Syria
    - Music of the United Arab Emirates
    - Music of Yemen
  - Music of Armenia
  - Assyrian music
  - Music of Azerbaijan
  - Music of Cyprus
  - Music of Georgia
  - Music of Iran
  - Music of Israel
    - Diaspora Jewish music
  - Music of Kurdistan
  - Music of Turkey
- Music of North Asia
  - Music of Russia

== See also ==
- List of cultural and regional genres of music
- Byzantine music
- Music of: Africa, Europe, Latin America, North America, and Oceania
