= Kulintang =

Southeast Asian traditional instrument

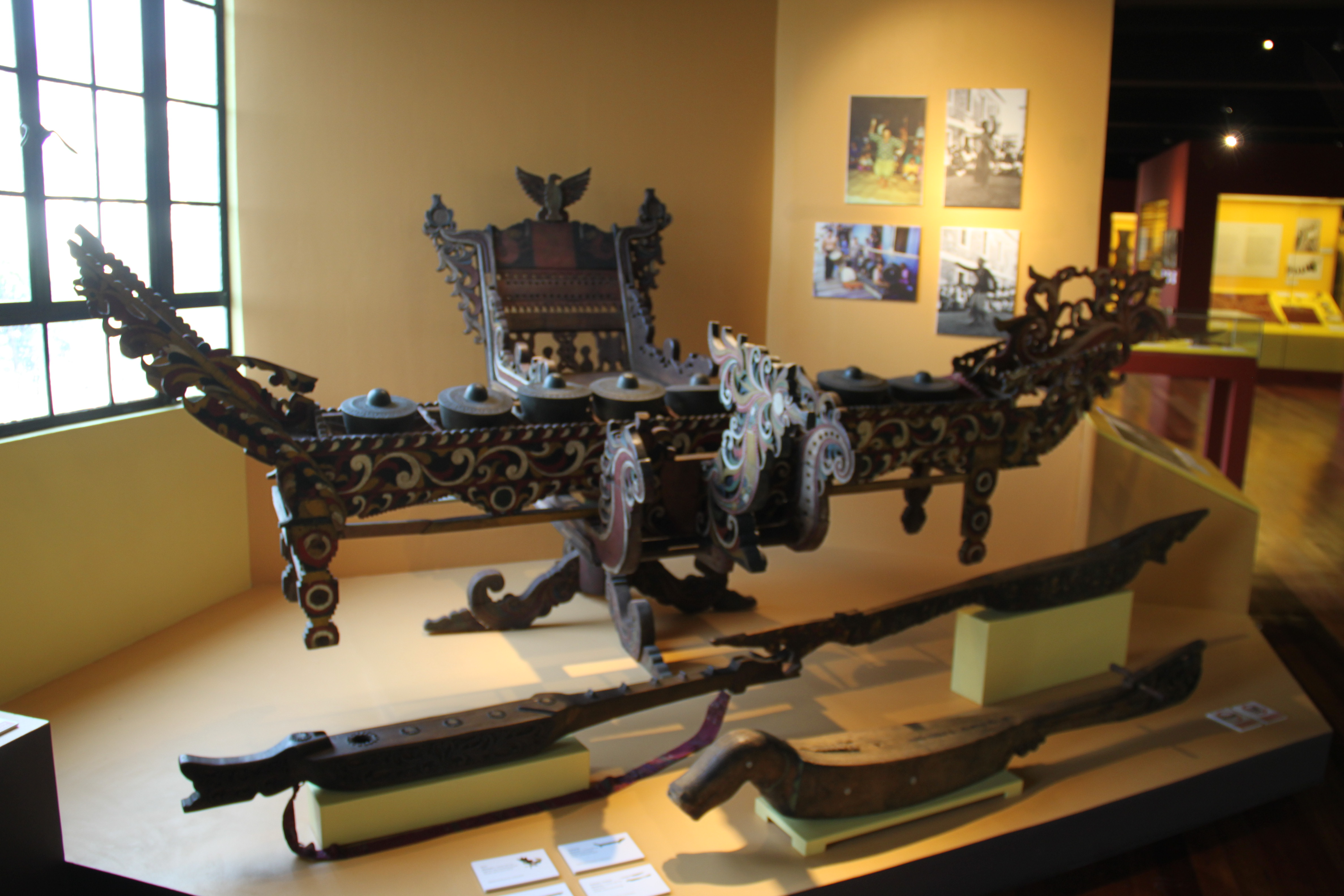
- A kulintang ensemble of the Maranao people with elaborate okir carvings in the Museum of the Filipino People
- Other names: Calculintang, Gulingtangan, Kolintang, Kulintangan, Totobuang
- Classification: Percussion instrument; Idiophone; Gong
- Developed: Javanese influence, Brunei, Indonesia, Malaysia, Philippines and Timor-Leste

Playing range
- Pelog and Slendro scales

Related instruments
- bonang, kenong, canang, keromong, kromong, kethuk, trompong/terompong, rejong, talempong, chalempung, caklempong/caklempung, khong wong yai/khong wong lek, khong toch/ khong thom, khong vong, krewaing/krewong

More articles or information
- Gamelan; Talempong; Piphat

Kulintang ensemble
- Stylistic origins: Music of Southeast Asia • Music of Brunei• Music of Indonesia • Music of Malaysia • Music of Philippines • Music of Timor-Leste
- Cultural origins: Brunei, Indonesia, Malaysia, Southern Philippines, Timor-Leste
- Typical instruments: Kulintang • Agung • Gandingan • Babandil • Dabakan

Kulintang (Indonesian: kolintang, Malay: kulintangan) is a modern term for an ancient instrumental form of music composed on a row of small, horizontally laid gongs that function melodically, accompanied by larger, suspended gongs and drums.

As part of the larger gong-chime culture of Southeast Asia, kulintang music ensembles have been playing for many centuries in regions of the Southern Philippines, Eastern Malaysia, Eastern Indonesia, Brunei and Timor, Kulintang evolved from a simple native signaling tradition, and developed into its present form with the incorporation of knobbed gongs from Sundanese people in Java Island, Indonesia. Its importance stems from its association with the indigenous cultures that inhabited these islands prior to the influences of Hinduism, Buddhism, Islam, Christianity or the West, making kulintang the most developed tradition of Southeast Asian archaic gong-chime ensembles.

== Etymology ==
Technically, kulintang is the Maguindanaon, Lumad Ternate, Moluccas, and Timor term for the idiophone of metal gong kettles which are laid horizontally upon a rack to create an entire kulintang set. It is played by striking the bosses of the gongs with two wooden beaters. Due to its use across a wide variety groups and languages, the kulintang is also called kolintang by the people of Maranao and Sulawesi, kulintango by Mongondow, totobuang by those in central Maluku, kulintangan and gulintangan by those in Brunei, Sabah, North Kalimantan and the Sulu Archipelago. Gulintangan or gulingtangan literally means rolling hands in Brunei, Sabah and Sulu.

By the twentieth century, the term kulintang had a come to denote an entire Maguindanao ensemble of five or six instruments. Traditionally the Maguindanao term for the entire ensemble is basalen or palabunibunyan, the latter term meaning “an ensemble of loud instruments” or “music-making” or in this case “music-making using a kulintang.”

== Geographic extent ==
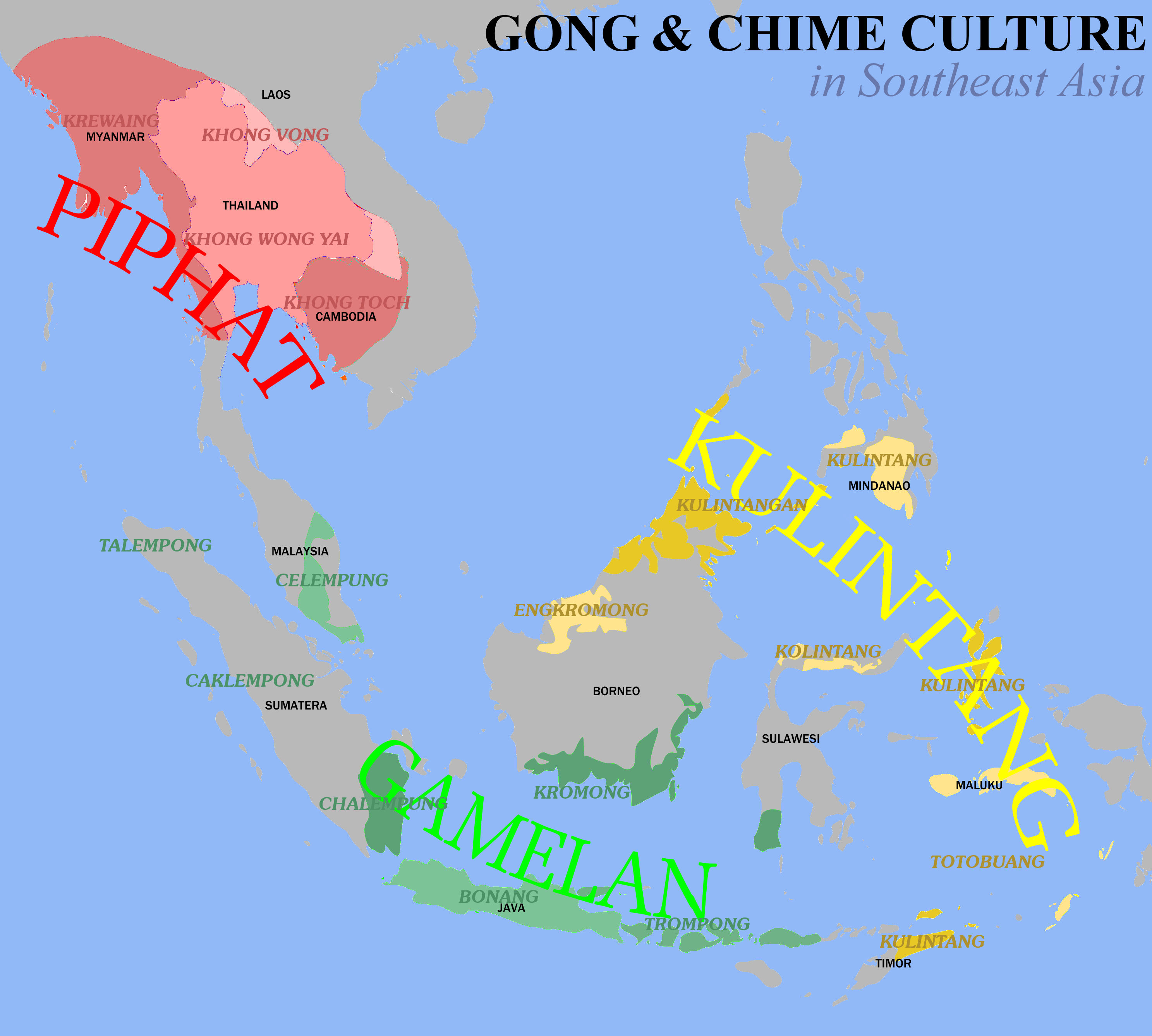
Map of kulintang music in Southeast Asia.

Kulintang belongs to the larger unit/stratum of “knobbed gong-chime culture” prevalent in Southeast Asia. It is considered one of the region's three major gong ensembles, alongside the gamelan of western Indonesia and piphat of Thailand, Burma, Cambodia and Laos, which use gongs and not wind or string instruments to carry the melodic part of the ensemble. Like the other two, kulintang music is primarily orchestral with several rhythmic parts orderly stacked one upon another. It is also based upon the pentatonic scale. However, kulintang music differs in many aspects from gamelan music, primarily in the way the latter constructs melodies within a framework of skeletal tones and prescribed time interval of entry for each instruments. The framework of kulintang music is more flexible and time intervals are nonexistent, allowing for such things as improvisations to be more prevalent.

Because kulintang-like ensembles extended over various groups with various languages, the term used for the horizontal set of gongs varied widely. Along with it begin called kulintang, it is also called kolintang, kolintan, kulintangan, kwintangan, k’lintang, gong sembilan, gong duablas, momo, totobuang, nekara, engkromong, kromong/enkromong and recently kakula/kakula nuada. Kulintang-like instruments are played by the Maguindanaon; the Maranao, Iranun, Kalagan, Kalibugan, Tboli, Blaan, Subanon, and other Lumad tribes of Mindanao, the Tausug, Sama-Bajau, Yakan and the Sangir/Sangil of the Sulu archipelago; the Ambon, Banda, Seram, Ternate, Tidore, and Kei of Maluku; and the Bajau, Suluk, Murut, Kadazan-Dusun, Kadayah and Paitanic Peoples of Sabah, the Malays of Brunei, the Bidayuh and Iban/Sea Dayak of Sarawak, the Bolaang Mongondow and Kailinese/Toli-Toli of Sulawesi and other groups in Banjarmasin and Tanjung in Kalimantan and Timor.

== History ==
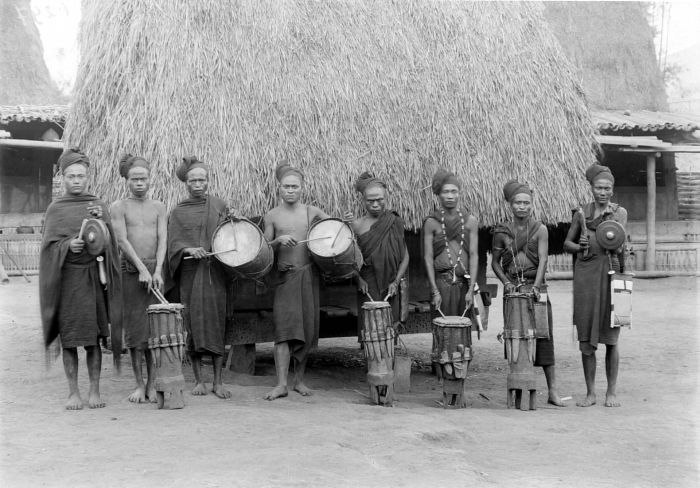
A group of men from the Ngada tribe with drums and gongs (Kulintang) in Ngada, Flores, Dutch East Indies (Indonesia). in 1913

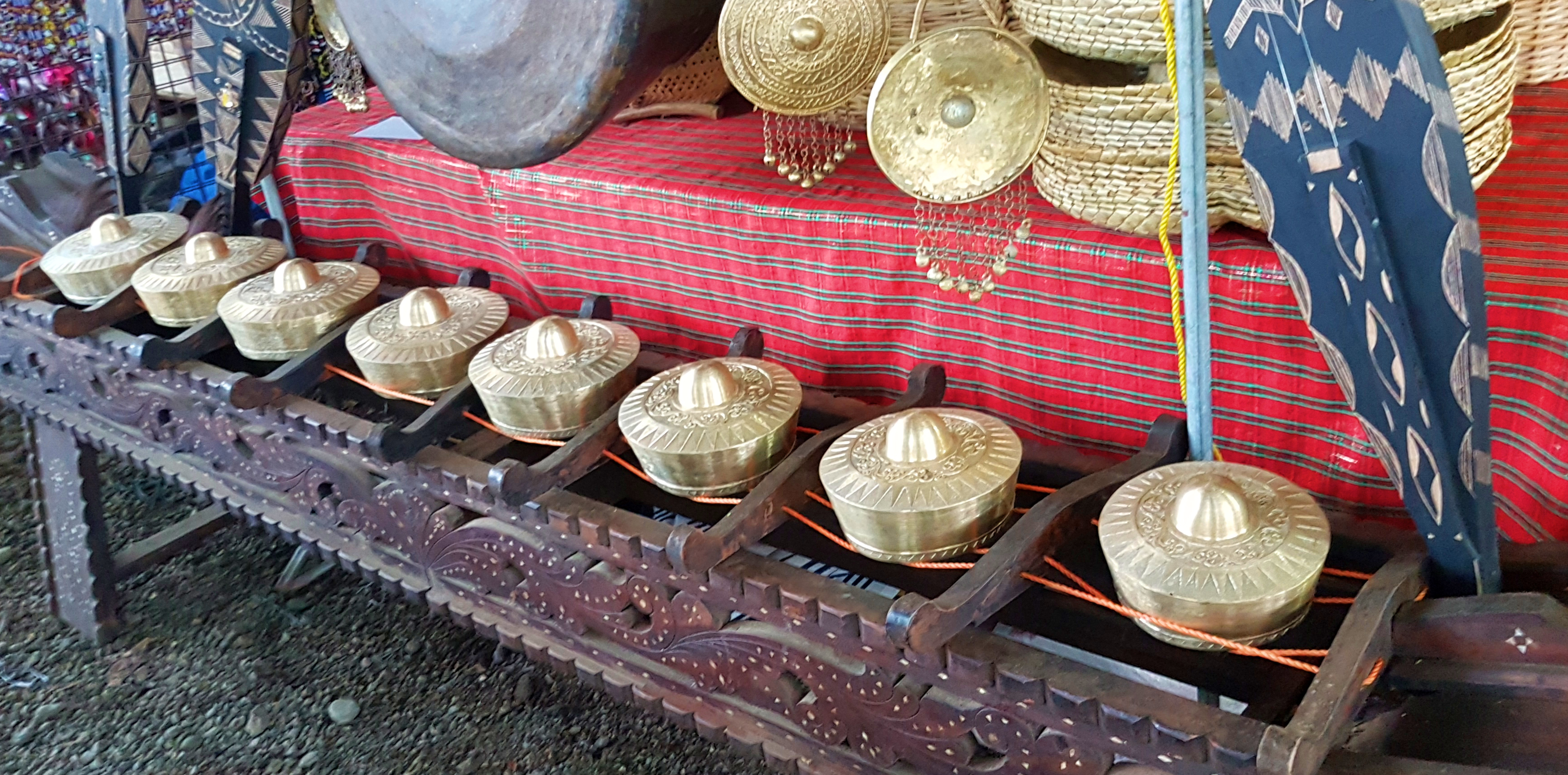
A Lumad kulintang ensemble from Bukidnon with the traditional carvings

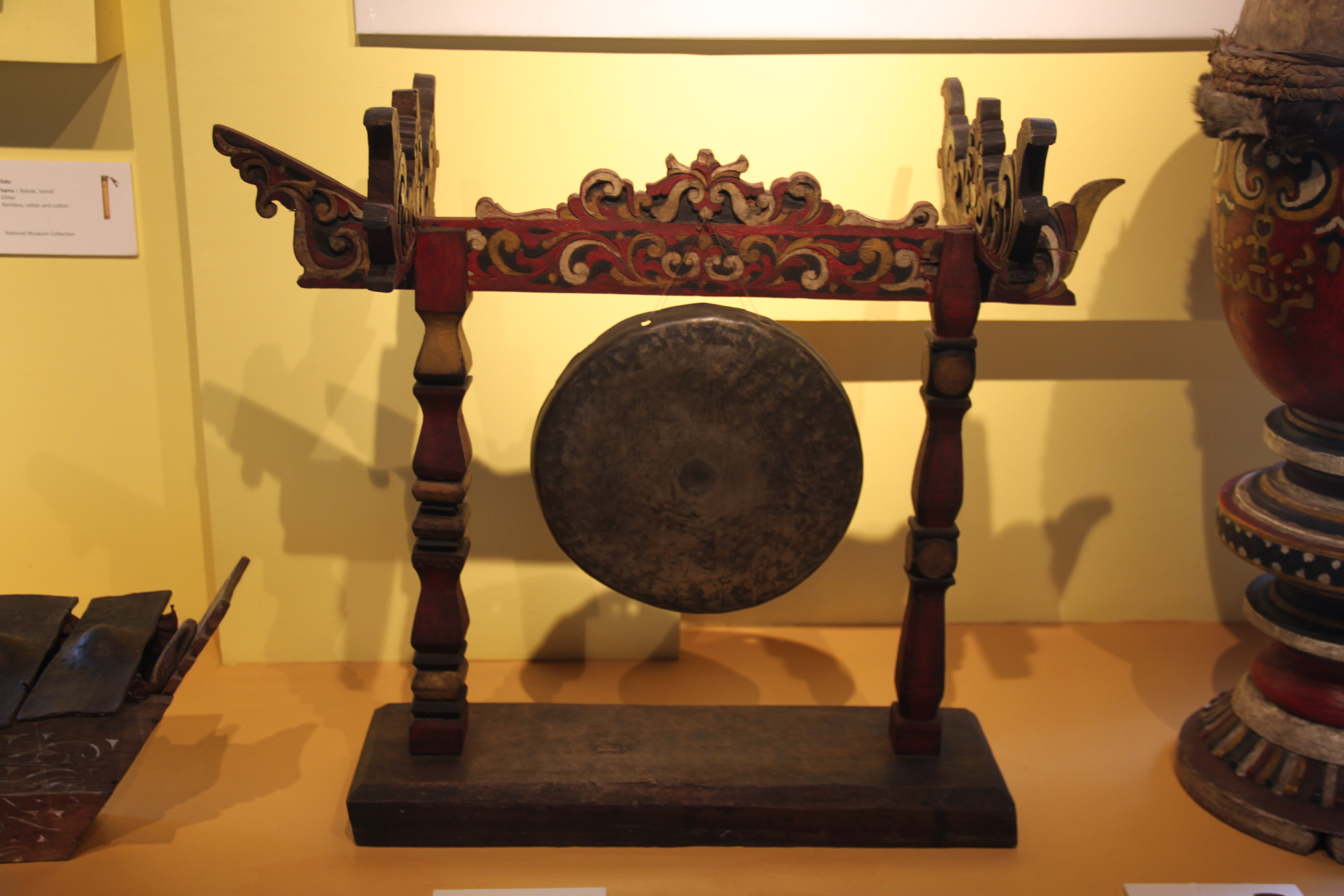
Maranao agong

Kulintang music is considered an ancient tradition that predates the influences of Hinduism, Buddhism, Islam, Christianity, and the West. In the Philippines, it represents the highest form of gong music attained by Filipinos and in North Maluku, it is said to have existed for centuries.

=== Origin of the gong ===
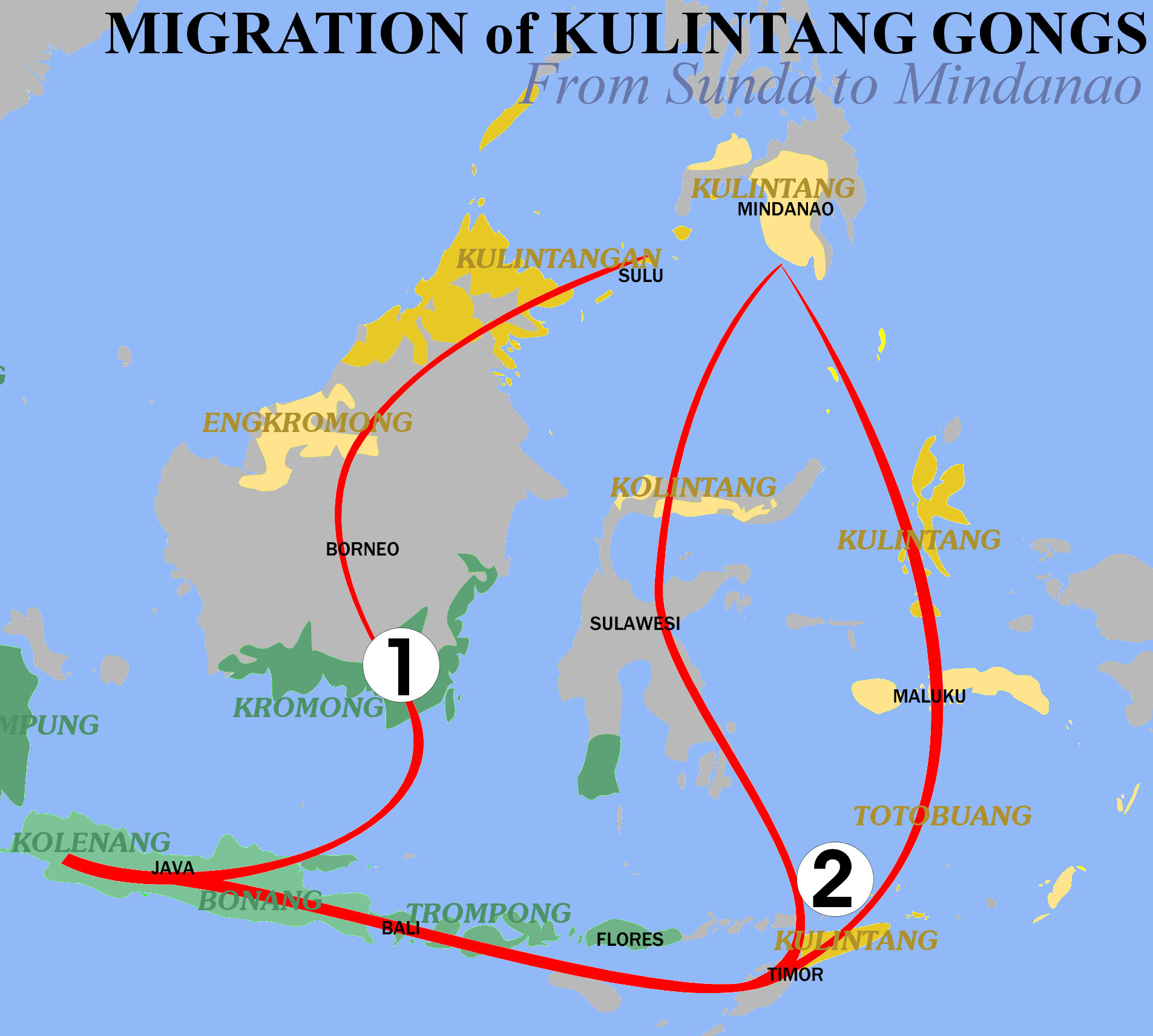
Two proposed routes for the migration of the kulintang gong to Mindanao

The kulintang gong itself is believed to have been one of those foreign musical elements incorporated into kulintang music, derived from the Sundanese kolenang due to its striking similarities. Along with the fact that they play important roles in their respectively ensembles, both the kulintang and kolenang show striking homogeneity in tapered rims (as opposed to pronouncedly tapered Javanese bonang and non-tapered Laotian khong vong gongs). Even the word kulintang is believed to be just an altered form of the Sundanese word kolenang.

=== Development of the kulintang ===
It was these similarities that lead theorists to conclude that the kulintang was originally imported to the Philippines during the migration of the kolenang through the Indonesian Archipelago. Based on the etymology, two routes have been proposed as the route for the kulintang to Mindanao: one from Sunda through Banjermasin, Brunei and the Sulu Archipelago, a route where the word “kulintangan” is commonly used for the horizontal row of gongs; the other from Sunda through Timor, Sulawesi, Moluccas and Mindanao where the word kolintang/kulintang is commonly seen.

As ancient as this music is, there has never been substantial data recorded regarding the kulintang's origins. The earliest historical accounts of instruments resembling those of the present day kulintang are in the writings of various European explorers from the 16th century who would have seen such instruments used in passing.

Because of limited data concerning gong music prior to European exploration, theories abound as to when the prototypes of what is now the kulintang came to be. One theory suggest that the bronze gong had an ancient history in Southeast Asia, arriving in the Indonesian archipelago two or even three thousand years ago, making its way to the Philippines from China in the third century AD. Another theory lays doubt to the former claim, suggesting the kulintang could not have existed prior to the 15th century due to the belief that Javanese (Indonesian) gong tradition, which is what the kulintang was believed to be derived from, developed only by the 15th century.

In Borneo, the kulintang was originally played during the harvest festival and the Bruneian court. With the expansion of Bruneian empire which at some point encompassed the island of Borneo and southern Philippines, the tradition of kulintang was adopted by the inland Dayak tribes. With that, the tradition of kulintang was expanded to include various tribe ceremonies such as before and after head-hunting expeditions and silat.

Though different theories abound as to the exact centuries the kulintang was finally realized, there is a consensus that kulintang music developed from a foreign musical tradition which was borrowed and adapted to the indigenous music tradition already present in the area. It's likely the earliest gongs used among the indigenous populace had no recreational value but were simply used for making signals and sending messages.

=== Future ===
The tradition of kulintang music has been waning throughout the Eastern Indonesia, and has become extinct in some places. Sets of five bronze gong-chimes and a gong making up the totobuang ensembles of Buru island in Central Maluku have also come to disuse. Kolintang sets of bossed kettle gongs were once played in Gorontalo, North Sulawesi long ago but that has all but disappeared, replaced by what locals are presently familiar with—a slab-key instrument known as a kolintang.

The extent of past kulintang tradition in the Philippines, particularly in the Northern and Central islands of Luzon and the Visayas, will never be fully known due to the harsh realities of three hundred years of Spanish colonization. The fact that there are areas which were able to keep kulintang tradition alive during European colonization has caused some observers to aptly term this music “the music of resistance.”

In 1968, at the University of the Philippines, eminent ethnomusicologist Professor José Maceda ushered in a new interest in kulintang music with the kulintang Master, Aga Mayo Butocan. The latter devised a notation system and wrote Palabunibunyan, a collection of kulintang music pieces from Maguindanao—which made its study more accessible. Further, she emphasized the improvisational aspect of performing on the kulintang. This enhanced its popularity among students from all over the country.

Today, the existence of kulintang music is threatened by the influence of globalization, and the introduction of Western and foreign ideals into the region. Younger generations would rather listen to American music, or bike in the streets with other children than spend time practicing and imitating on the traditional instruments of their parents.

Philippine kulintang music has had a revival of sorts due to the work of Philippine-born, U.S.-educated musicians/ethnomusicologists Master Danongan "Danny" Kalanduyan and Usopay Cadar, as well as their predecessor Professor José Maceda. Through the work of Professor Robert Garfias, both Cadar and Kalanduyan began teaching and performing traditional kulintang music in the United States during the late 20th century; quite unexpectedly, the music became a bridge between contemporary Filipino American culture and ancient Philippine tribal traditions.

Both Kalanduyan and Cadar have been impressed that so many people lacking Maguindanaon or Maranao background, and some who are not even Filipino, have become dedicated students and supporters of their cultural heritage. An additional surprise came after a decade-long series of American-based kulintang students traveled to Mindanao to perform, sparking a kulintang renaissance in the Philippines. The groundwork for this Renaissance originated as early as 1978 through the work of one of the early cultural pioneers and activists amongst Filipino Americans, Robert Kikuchi-Yngojo. It was his dedication in the early 80's that created the cultural awareness in the Fil-Am community of San Franccisco that sparked a cultural movement. The knowledge of outsiders playing traditional kulintang has encouraged the younger generation of musicians in the Philippines, both in Mindanao and in Taguig, Metro Manila. Enthusiastic appreciation by foreigners has given life to a dying tradition, and the music has become a unifying force in the Philippine diaspora. For the first time in history, kulintang music is now formally taught to music students at several universities located throughout Metro Manila.

== Instrument ==
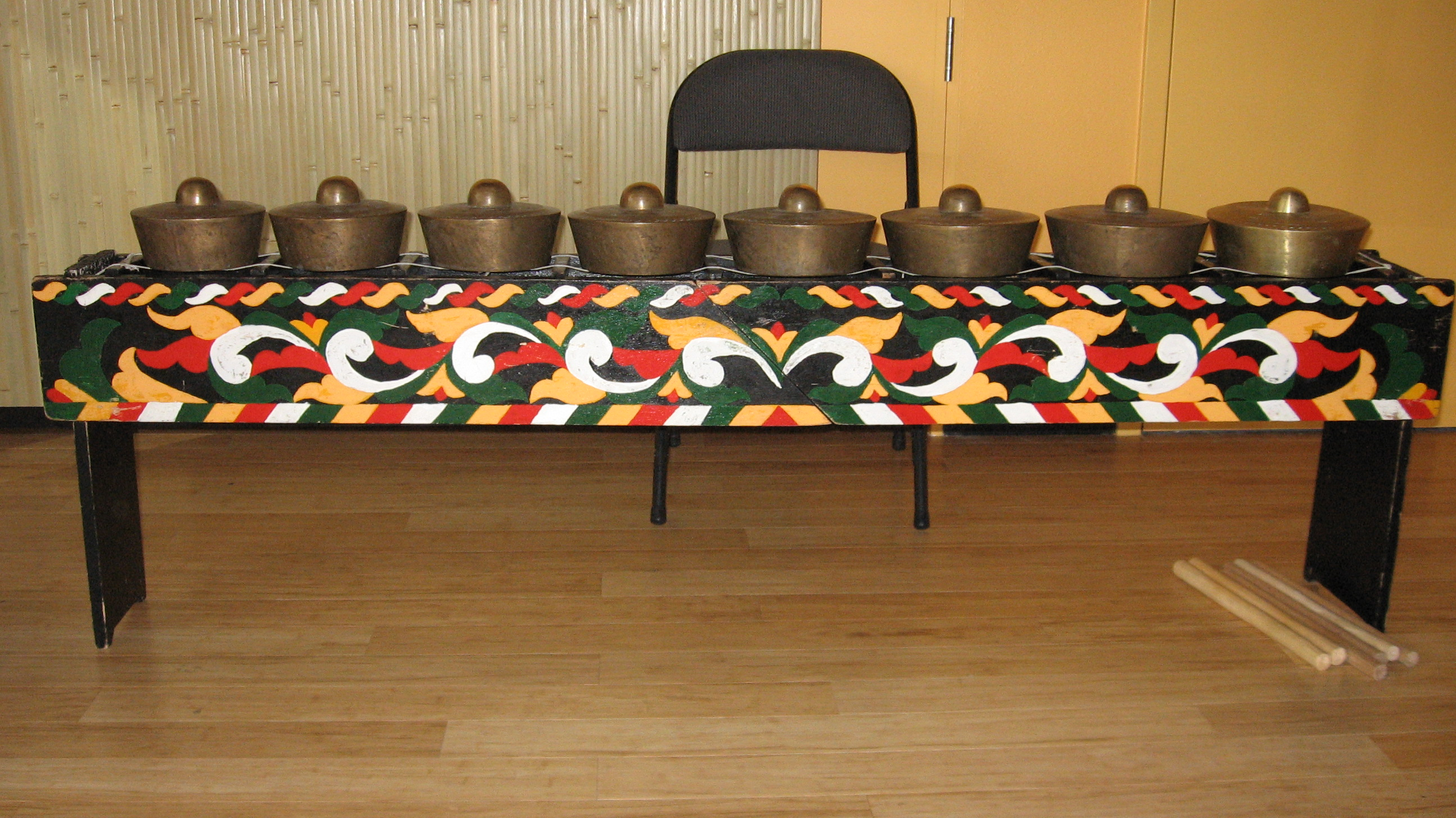
Kulintang from Mindanao.

=== Description ===
The instrument called the “kulintang” (or its other derivative terms) consist of a row/set of 5 to 9 graduated pot gongs, horizontally laid upon a frame arranged in order of pitch with the lowest gong found on the players’ left. The gongs are laid in the instrument face side up atop two cords/strings running parallel to the entire length of the frame, with bamboo/wooden sticks/bars resting perpendicular across the frame, creating an entire kulintang set called a "pasangan".

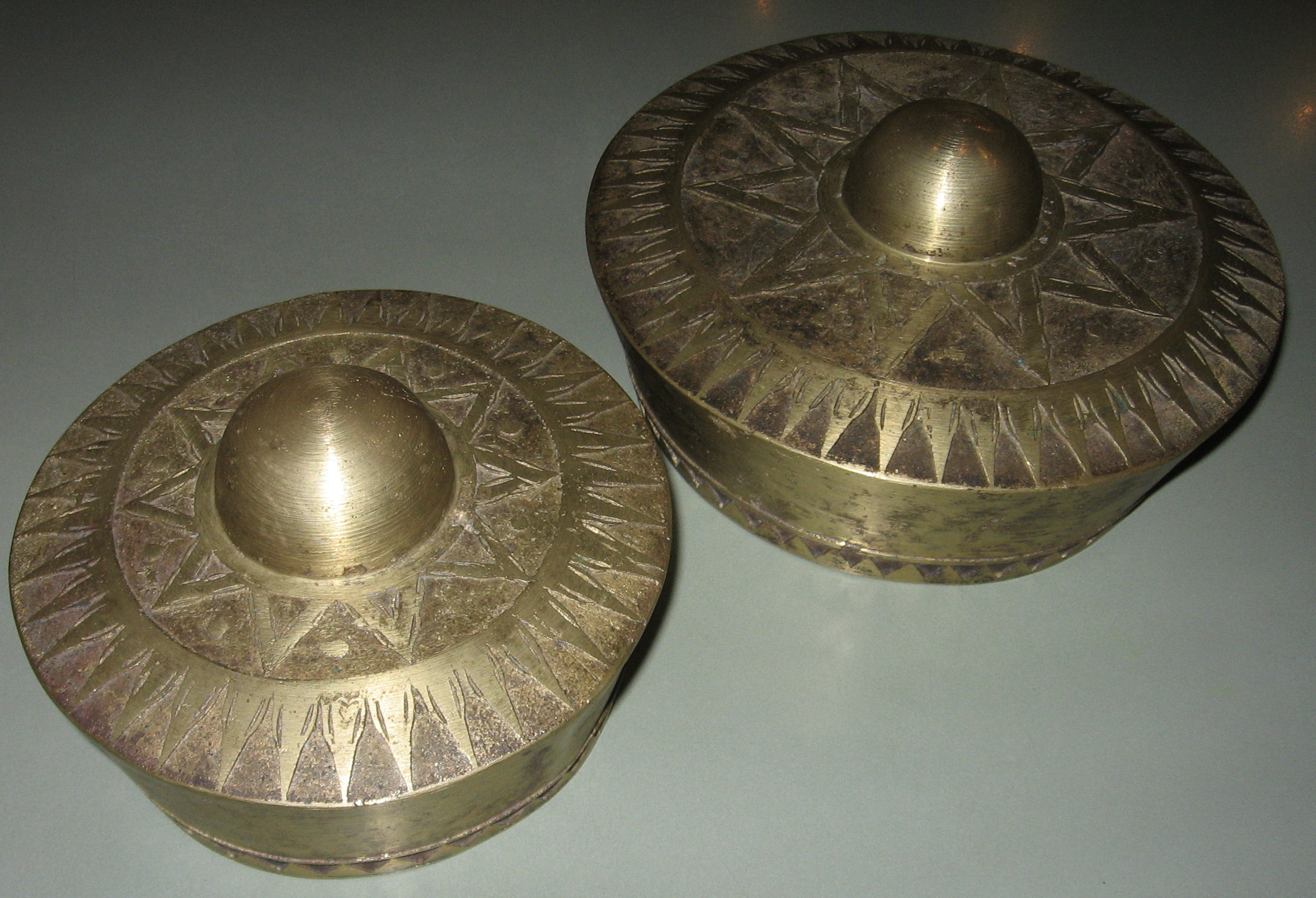
The different sized brass kulintang gongs.

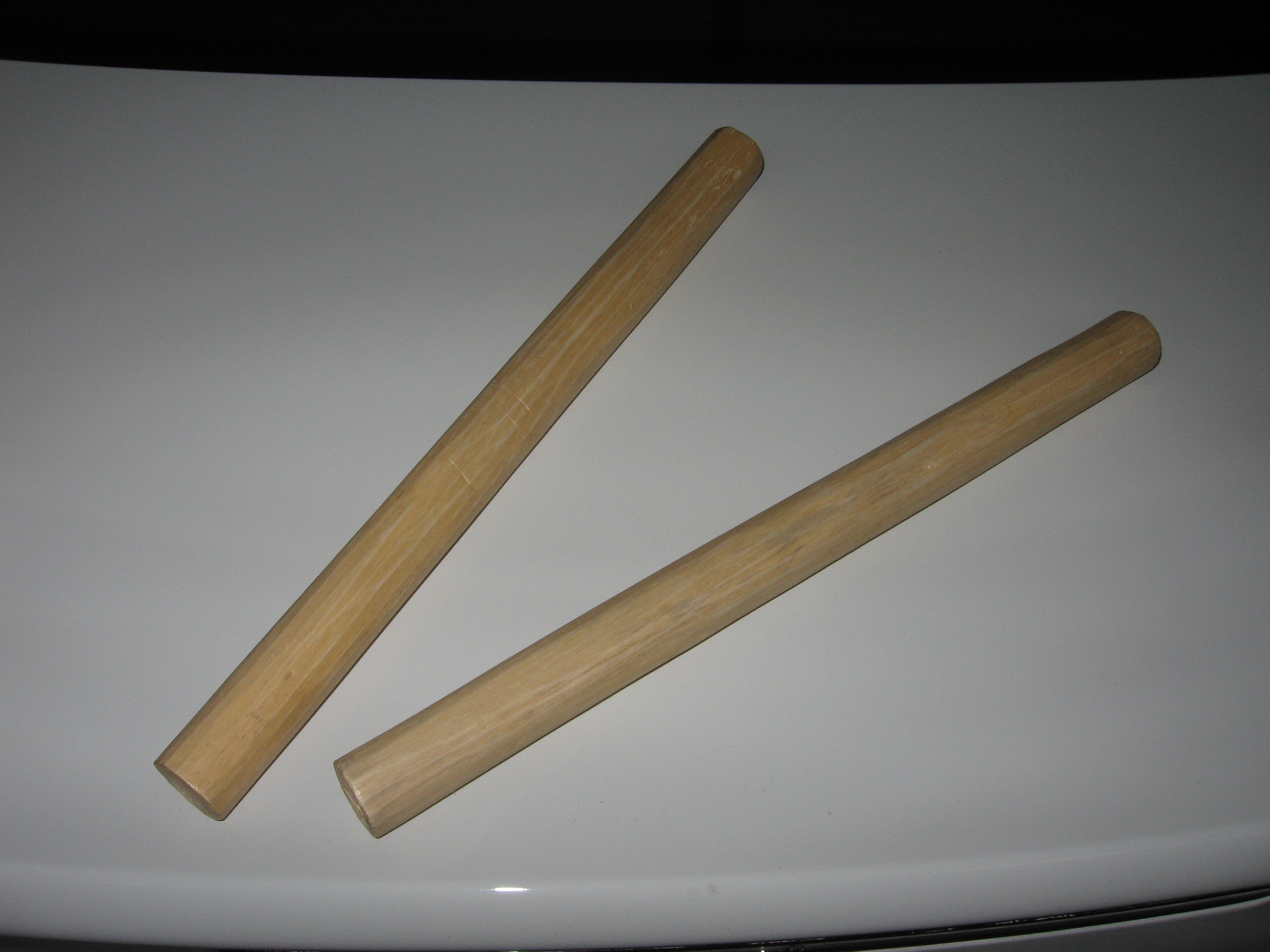
The light beaters used to strike the gong bosses.

The gongs weigh roughly from two pounds to three pounds each, and have dimensions of 6 to 10 inches for their diameters and 3 to 5 inches for their height. Traditionally they were made from bronze but due to the disruption and loss of trade routes between the islands of Borneo and Mindanao during World War II, resulting in loss of access to necessary metal ores, and the subsequent post-war use of scrap metal, brass gongs with shorter decaying tones are now commonplace.

The kulintang frame is known as an "antangan" by the Maguindanao (which means to “arrange”) and "langkonga" by the Maranao. The frame can be crude, made from simple bamboo/wooden poles, or it can be highly decorated and rich with traditional okil/okir motifs or arabesque designs. The frame is a necessary part of the instrument, and functions as a resonator.

It is considered taboo to step or cross over the antangan while the kulintang gongs are placed on it.

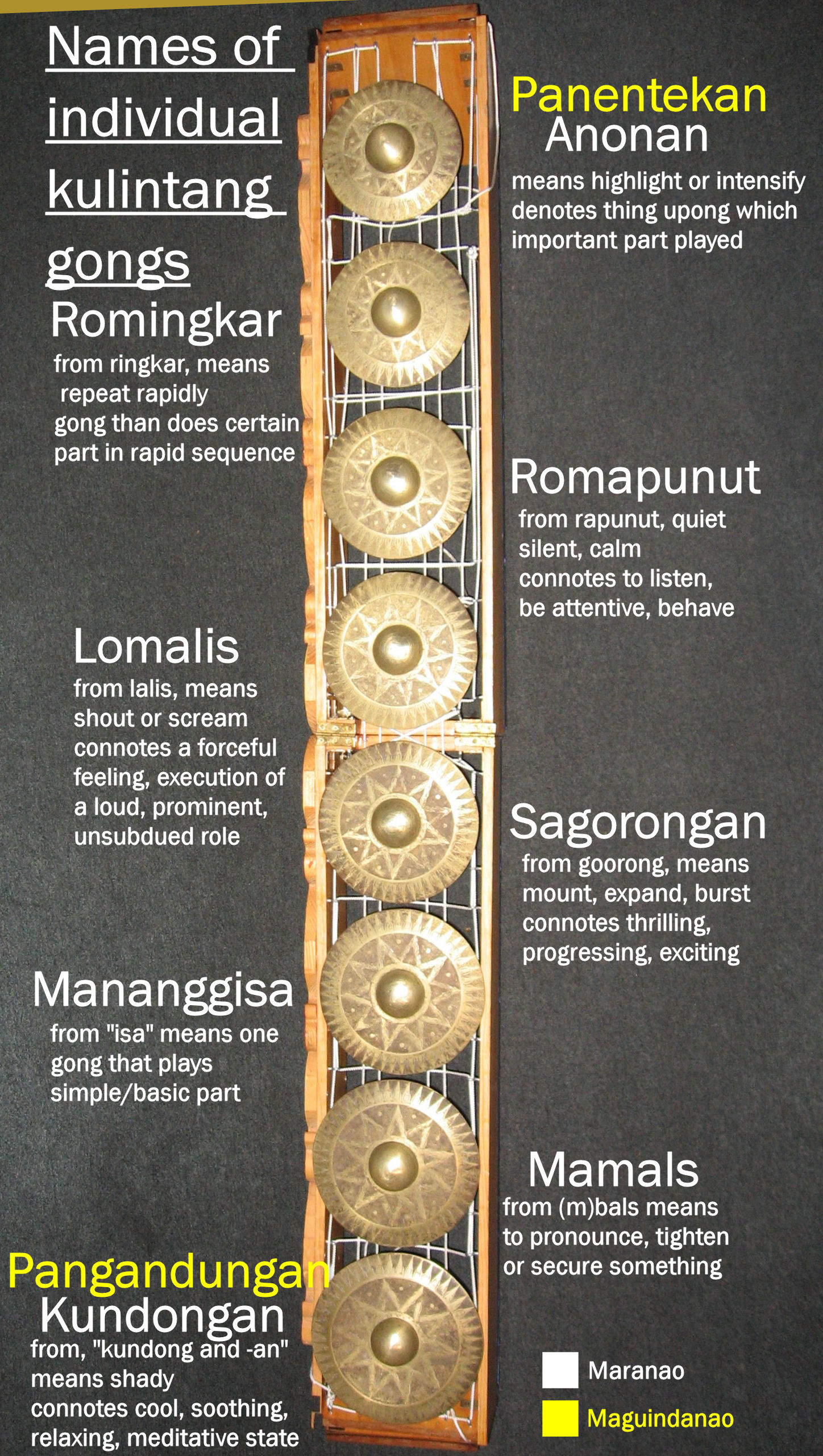
Individual names for each kulintang gong

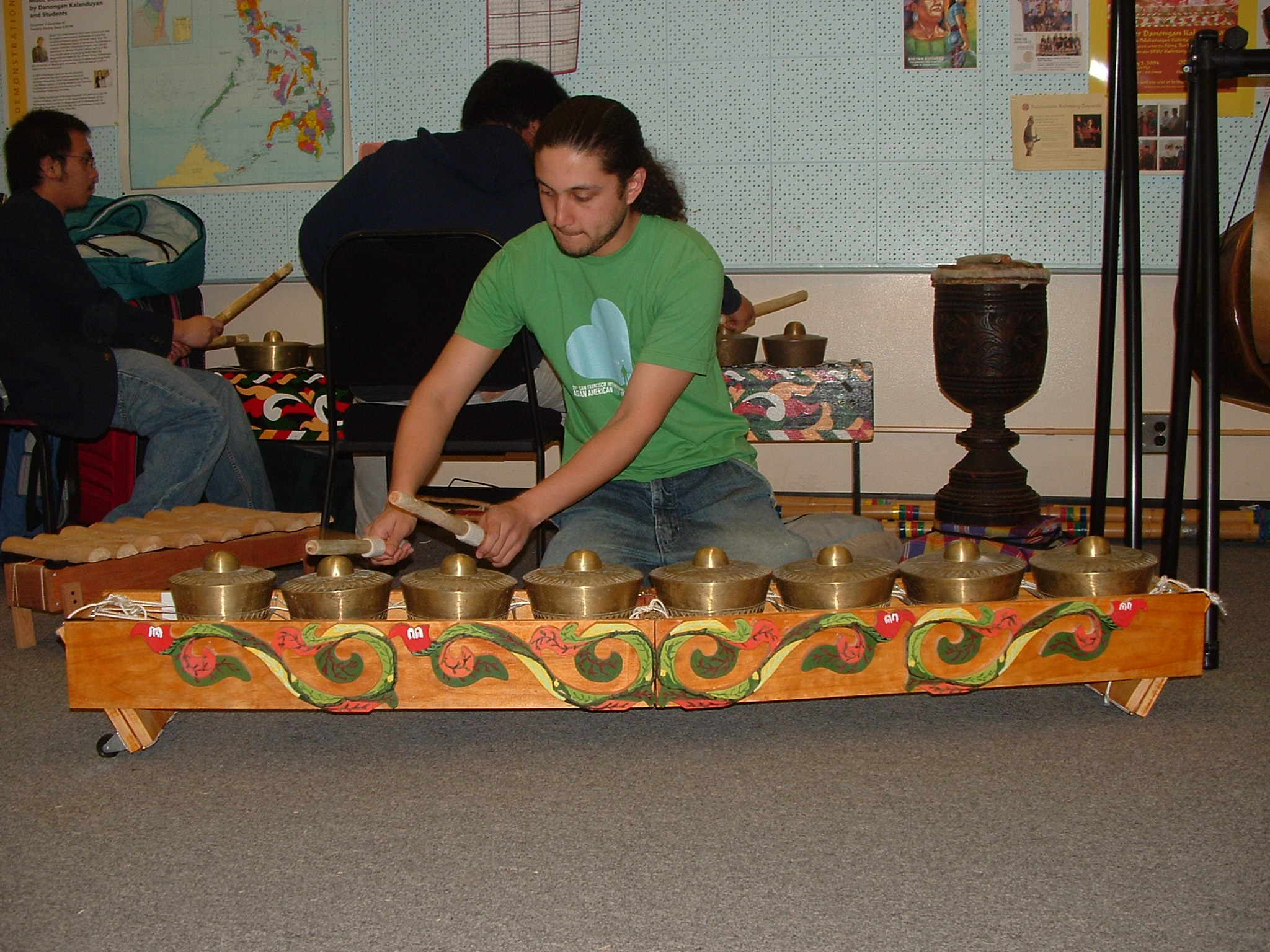
Those in the Sulu Archipelago play the kulintang on the floor.

=== Technique ===
The kulintang is played by striking the bosses of the gongs with two wooden beaters. When playing the kulintang, the Maguindanao and Maranao would always sit on chairs while for the Tausug/Suluk and other groups that who play the kulintangan, they would commonly sit on the floor. Modern techniques include twirling the beaters, juggling them in midair, changing the arrangement of the gongs either before or while playing, crossings hands during play or adding very rapid fire strokes all in an effort to show off a player's grace and virtuosity.

=== Casting ===
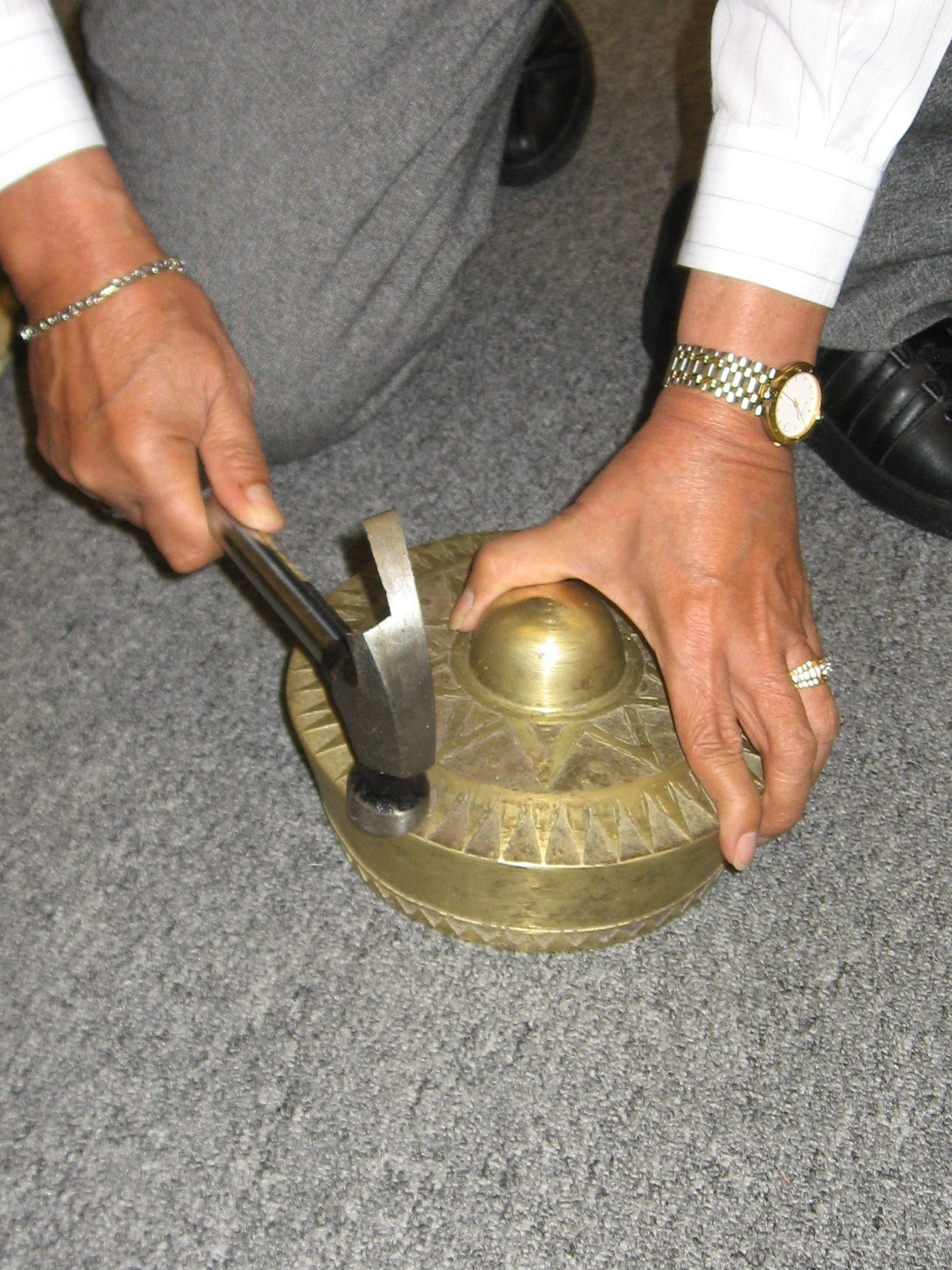
Tongkol process using a hammer to tune the gongs.

Kulintang gongs are made using the cire perdue method, a lost-wax process used for casting the individual gongs. The first phase is the creation of wax molds of the gongs. In the past, before the availability of standardized wax sheets made specifically for foundry use, the molds were made out of either beeswax (talo) or candle wax (kandilà). The wax mold is covered with a special mixture of finely powdered coal/mud, which is applied on the wax surface using a brush.

The layers are then left to dry under the sun, after which the entire mold is heated in a furnace to melt away the wax and hardening the coal/mud mixture, leaving behind a hollowed shell. With this hardened mold, molten bronze is poured down the mold's mouth cavity, cooled to a certain degree, then the coal/mud is broken apart, revealing a new gong. The gong is then refined, cleaned, and properly identified by the blacksmith (pandáy). Finally, the gongs are refined using the tongkol process, tuning these either by hammering the boss from the inside to slightly raise its pitch, or by hammering the boss from the outside to lower the pitch. The correct tuning is found by ear, with players striking a sequence of gongs, looking for a melodic contour they are familiar with.

=== Tuning ===
Unlike westernized instrumentation, there is no set tuning for kulintang sets throughout the Philippines. Great variation exist between each set due to differences in make, size and shape, alloy used giving each kulintang set a unique pitch level, intervals and timbre. Though the tuning varies greatly, there does exist some uniformity to contour when same melody heard on different kulintang sets. This common counter results in similar interval relationships of more or less equidistant steps between each of the gongs. This tuning system, not based upon equal temperament or upon a system of standard pitches but on a similar/certain pattern of large and small intervals, could also be found among the gamelan orchestras of western Indonesia. In fact, though the Maguindanao, Maranao and Tausug artists technically have no concept of scale (because emphasis placed on the concept of “rhythmic modes”), the Pelog and Slendro scales of Java were found to be most satisfactory to their own varying pentatonic/heptatonic scales.

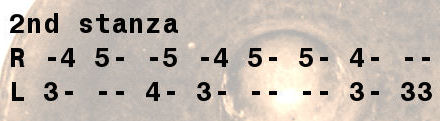
Example of kulintang cipher notation.

=== Notation system ===
Kulintang repertory lacked an indigenous notation system. Compositions were passed down orally from generation to generation negating the need for notation for the pieces. Recent attempts have been made to transcribe the music using cipher notation, with gongs indicated by a numbering system for example, starting from 1 to 8 with the lowest gong starting at number 1 for an eight gong kulintang set.

=== Feminine instrument ===
The kulintang is traditionally considered a women's instrument by many groups: the Maguindanao, Maranao, Tausūg/Suluk, Samal, Badjao/Sama, Iranun, Kadazan, Murut, Bidayuh and Iban. Traditionally, the playing of the kulintang was associated with graceful, slow, frail and relaxed movements that showed elegance and decorum common among females. Nowadays, the traditional view of kulintang as strictly for women has waned as both women and men play all five instruments, with some of the more renowned kulintang players being men.

== Performance ==
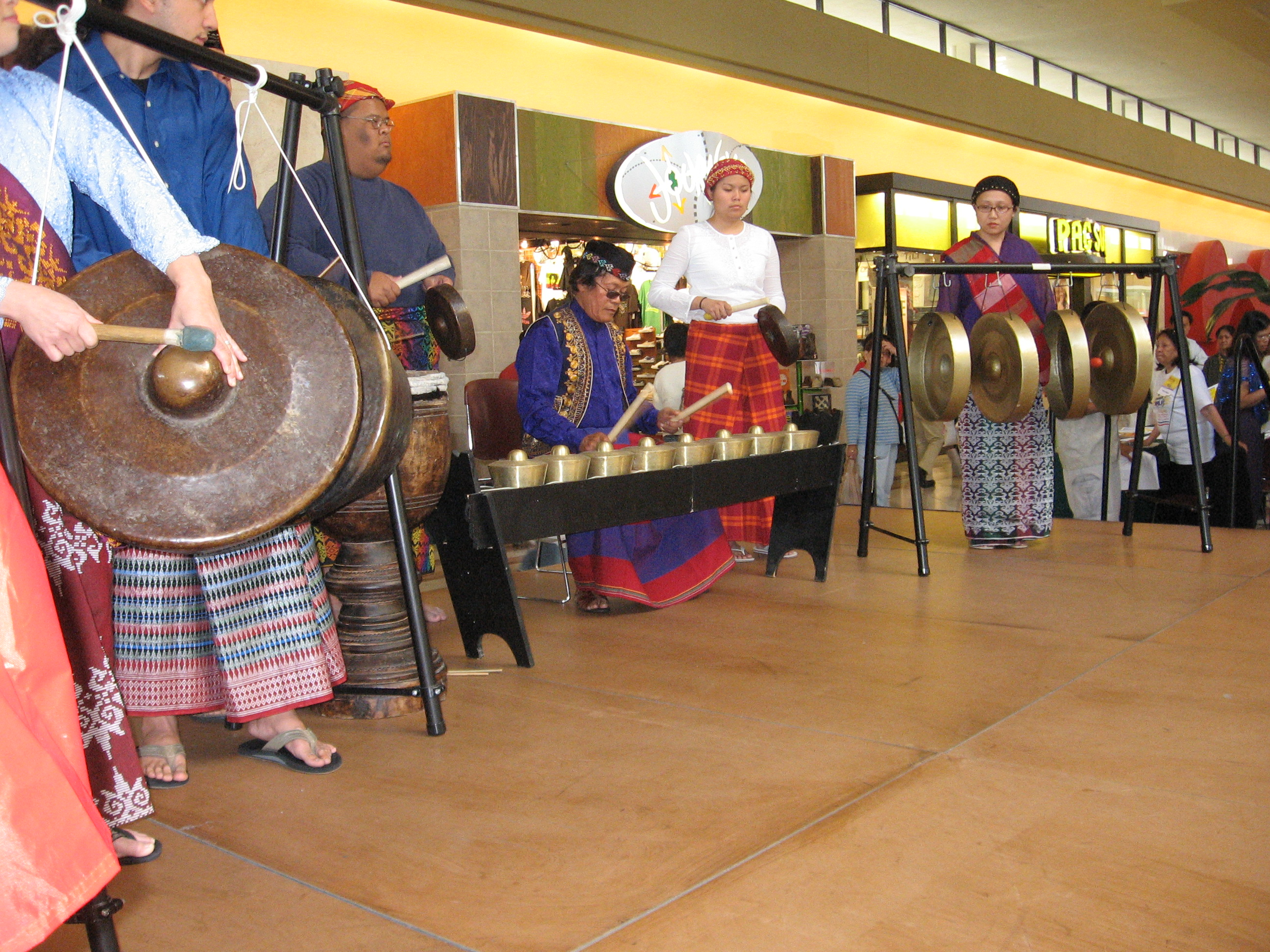
A kulintang ensemble performance in Daly City, California

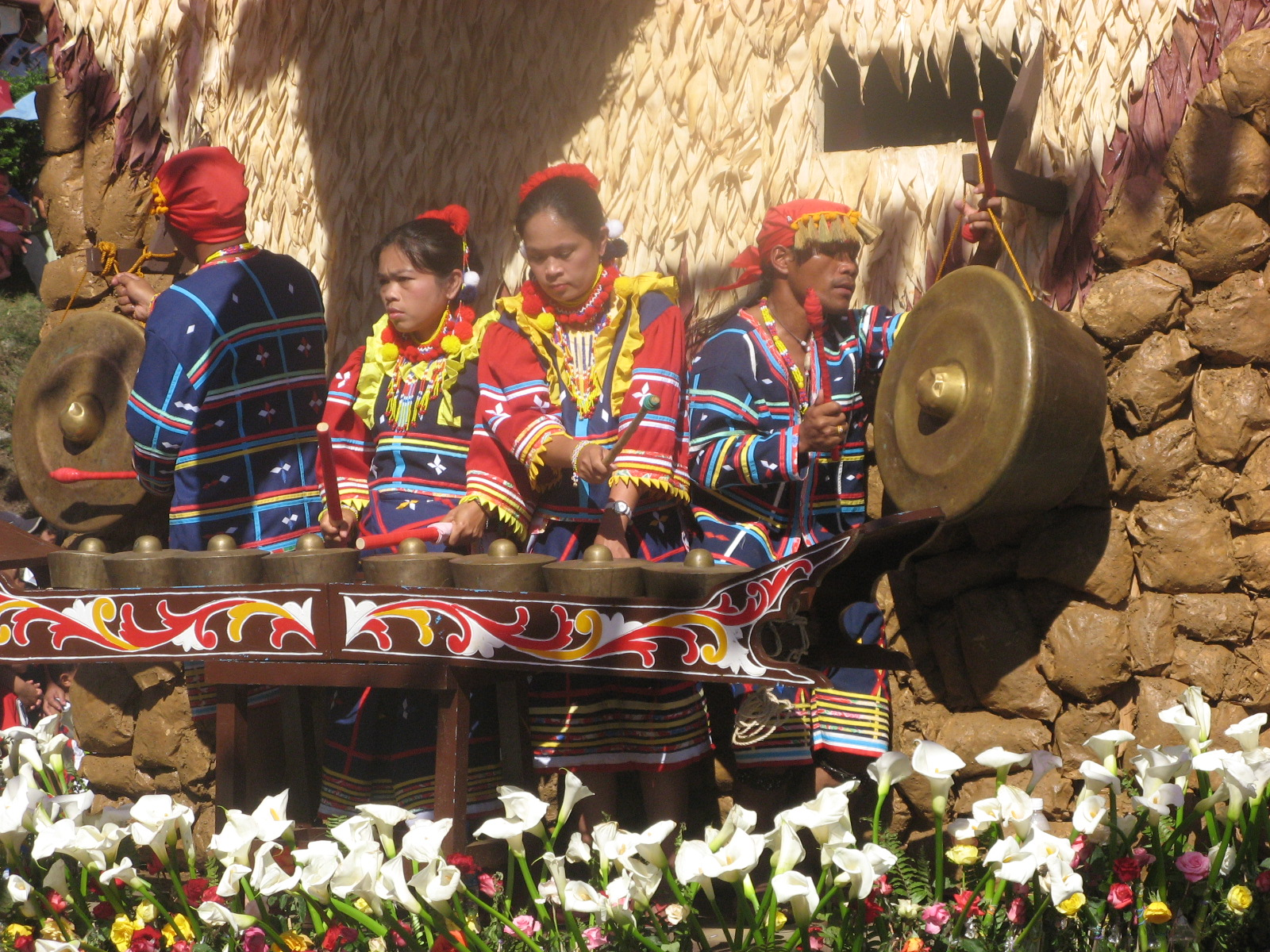
A traditional kulintang ensemble being played by the Matigsalug people during the 2007 Kaamulan Festival of Bukidnon, Philippines

The main purpose for kulintang music in the community is to function as social entertainment at a professional, folk level. This music is unique in that it is considered a public music in the sense everyone is allowed to participate. Not only do the players play, but audience members are also expected to participate. These performances are important in that they bring people in the community and adjacent regions together, helping unify communities that otherwise may not have interacted with one another. Traditionally, when performers play kulintang music, their participation is voluntary. Musicians see performances as an opportunity to receive recognition, prestige and respect from the community and nothing more.

Generally, performances can be classified as either formal ones or informal. During formal performances adherents follow a traditional set of rules that would govern playing and it usually involved people from outside the home. Informal performances are quite the opposite. The strict rules that normally govern play are often ignored and the performers are usually between people well acquainted with one another, usually close family members. These performances usually were times when amateurs practiced on the instruments, young boys and girls gathered the instruments, substituting the kulintang with the saronay and inubab. Ensembles didn't necessary have to have five instruments like formal performances: they could be composed of only four instruments (three gandingan gongs, a kulintang, an agung, and a dabakan), three instruments (a kulintang, a dabakan, and either an agung or three gandingan gongs) or simply just one instrument (kulintang solo).

== Social functions ==
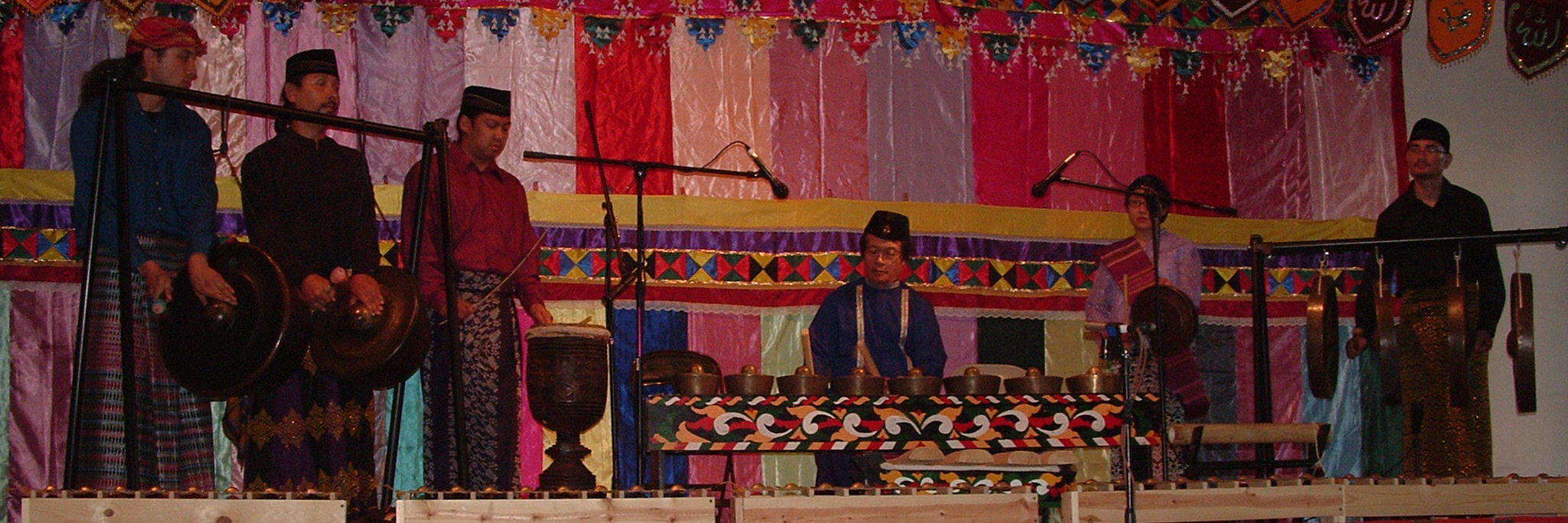
A kulintang ensemble being used for purpose of entertainment.

Kulintang music generally could be found as the social entertainment at a host of different occasions. It is used during large feasts, festive/harvest gatherings, for entertainment of visiting friends and relatives, and at parades. Kulintang music also accompanies ceremonies marking significant life events, such as weddings and returnees from the Hajj. Kulintang music also plays a significant role during state functions, used during official celebrations, entertaining of foreign dignitaries and important visitors of distant lands, court ceremonies of either the sultanate or village chieftains, enthroning/coronations of a new leader and the transferral of a sultanate from one family to another.

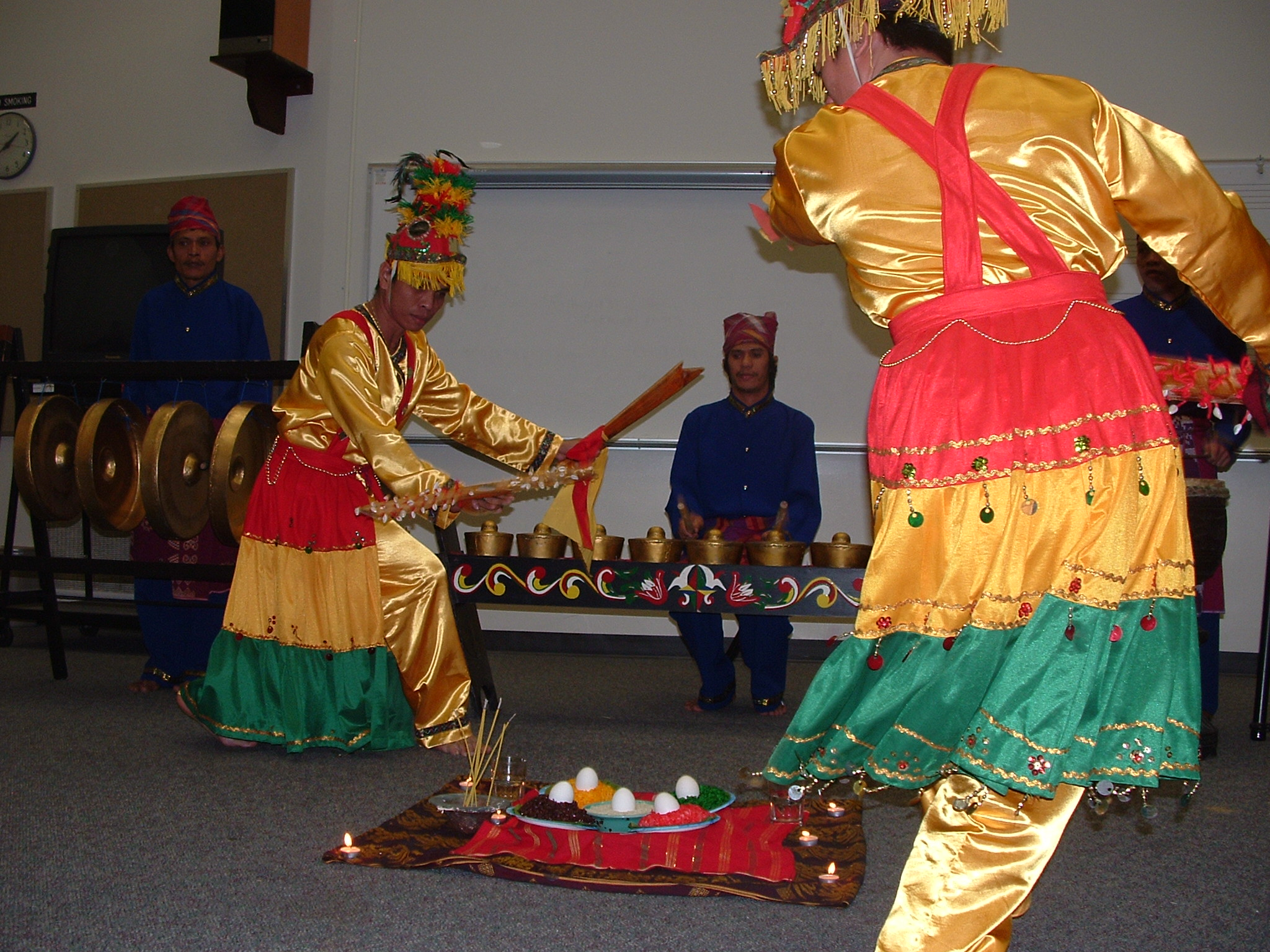
A Maguindanaon kulintang ensemble accompanying a healing ritual dance called Sagayan.

Kulintang music is prohibited from being played inside mosques and during Islamic rites/observances/holidays, such as the fasting month of Ramadan, where playing is only allowed at night when people are allowed to eat after Iftar. It is also prohibited during the mourning period of the death of an important person, during funerals, and during the peak times of the planting and harvest season.

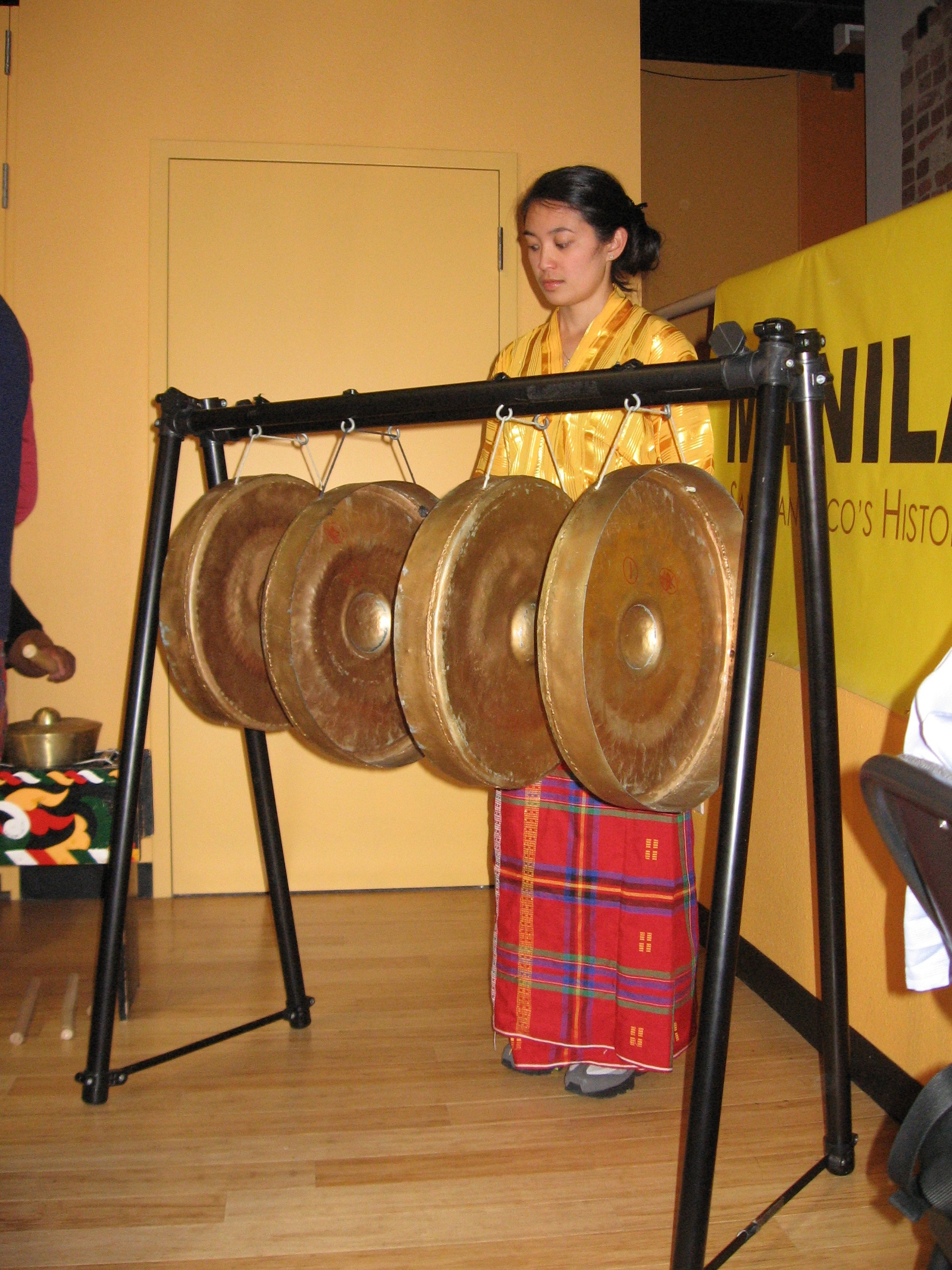
The gandingan is normally chosen for playing apad renditions

=== Other uses ===
Kulintang instrument has uses other than public performances. It also is used to accompany healing ceremonies/rituals (pagipat)/animistic religious ceremonies. Though this practice has died out among the Maranao due to its non-Islamic nature, some areas in Mindanao, Sabah and Maluku still practice this ancient tradition.

Kulintang music can be used for communicating long distance messages from one village or longhouse to another. Called apad, these renditions mimic the normal speaking tones of the Maguindanao language, creating a specific message or, through the use of double entendre, a social commentary understood by nearly any adult native Maguindanao speaker. However, apad is falling into disuse because times have changed, and the necessity of its use for long-distance communication purposes has faded away. Anun as a music without a message, is used instead to express sentiments and feelings, and has come more and more into use due to its compatibility with the musical elaborations and idiosyncratic styles of the times.

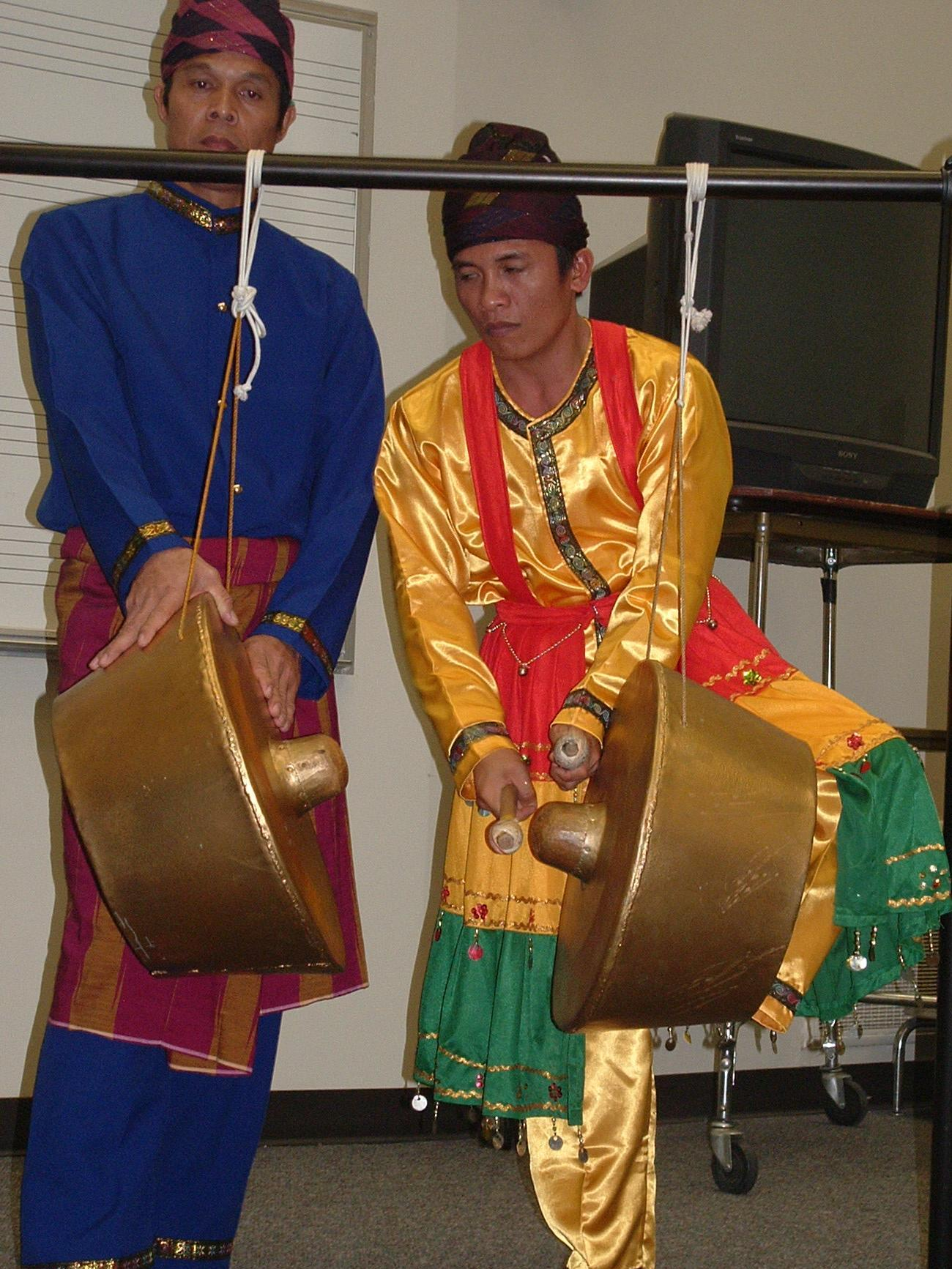
An agung contestant performing on the agung using two balus.

Kulintang music was also crucial in relation to courtships due to the very nature of Islamic custom, which did not allow for unmarried men and women to intermingle. Traditionally, unmarried daughters were kept in a special chamber in the attic called a lamin, off-limits to visitors and suitors. It was only when she was allowed to play during kulintang performances that suitors were allowed to view her. Because of this, kulintang music was one of the rare socially approved vehicles for interaction among the sexes.

Musical contest, particularly among the Maguindanao, have become a unique feature of these kulintang performances. They occur at almost all the formal occasions mentioned above, particularly weddings. What has made the Maguindanao stand out from the other groups is that they practice solo gong contest – with individual players showcasing their skill on the various ensemble instruments – the agung, gandingan and the kulintang – as opposed to only group contest, where performers from one town and another town are pitted against each other.

== Compositions ==
=== Rhythmic modes ===
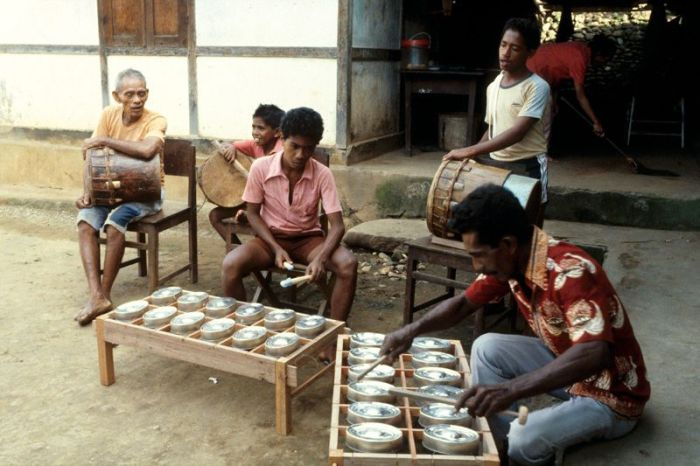
Musicians playing a totobuang (Kulintang) in Ambon, Maluku, Indonesia. Circa 1980

Kulintang music has no set compositions due to its concept of rhythmic modes. A rhythmic mode (or designation or genre or pattern) is defined as a musical unit that binds together the entire five instrument ensemble. By adding together the various rhythms of each instrument, one could create music and by changing one of the rhythms, one could create different music. This is the basis of the rhythmic mode.

=== Improvisation ===
The kulintang player's ability to improvise within the parameters of a rhythmic mode is a must. As with gamelan orchestras, each kulintang mode has a kind of theme the kulintang player “dresses up” by variations of ornamentation, manipulating segments by inserting repetitions, extensions, insertions, suspensions, variations and transpositions. This occurs at the discretion of the kulintang player. Therefore, the kulintang player functions not only as the one carrying the melody, but also as the conductor of the entire ensemble. She determines the length of each rendition and could change the rhythm at any time, speeding up or slowing down, accord to her personal taste and the composition she plays.

This emphasis on improvisation was essential due traditional role of the music as entertainment for the entire community. Listeners in the audience expected players to surprise and astound them by playing in their own unique style, and by incorporating improvisation to make newer versions of the piece. If a player simply imitated a preceding player, playing patterns without any improvisation, the audience members would believe she/he to be repetitious and mundane. This also explains why set performance pieces for musical productions are different in some respect—young men/women would be practicing before an event, therefore rarely relying on improvisations.

=== Maguindanaon and Maranao compositions ===
"Sinulog a Kamamatuan Ver. 1"
This is an example of kamamatuan style of the Maguindanao.

"Taggungo Ver. 1"
This sample of Taggungo is used only to accompany healing rituals with trance dancers performing the dance Sagayan.

Though allowing such a variety of rhythms would lead to innumerable patterns, generally one could categorize these rhythmic modes on the basis on various criteria such as the number of beats in a recurring musical phrase, differences in either the melodic and rhythmic groups within the musical phrase, rhythmic emphasis, opening formulas and/or cadential patterns. In Maguindanaon kulintang, three to five typical genres can be distinguished: duyug, sinulog, tidtu, binalig, and tagonggo, While Maranao kolintang has three typical genres: kapromayas or romayas, kapagonor or onor, and katitik pandai or kapaginandang.

These general genres could be further grouped among each other into styles/subcategories/stylistic modifiers, which are differentiated from one another based on instrumentation, playing techniques, function and the average age and gender of the musicians as well. Generally, these styles are differentiated by what is considered traditional or “old,” and more contemporary or “new.”

Old styles (kamamatuan in Maguindanao, andung in Maranao) are considered slow, well-pronounced and dignified. Genres classified under this style have moderate tempos, are rhythmically oriented, balanced, lack many improvisations and are typically played by seniors and are therefore always played first, to give due respect to the older generation.

New styles (kagungudan in Maguindanao, bago in Maranao) are considered fast, rhythmic and showy. Generally genres under this classification have faster tempos with an emphasis on power and speed, are highly rhythmic and pulsating, and are highly improvised with musicians employing different rhythmic/melodic formulae not used with old patterns. Younger musicians, especially men, gravitate toward this style because of its emphasis on virtuosity and one's individualism. Generally played after all kamamatuan pieces have been played to give younger musicians the opportunity to participate. Tagunggo cannot be easily classified under one of these styles, being more ritualistic than recreational in nature. Tagunggo is a rhythmic mode often used to accompany trance and dance rituals such as sagayan. During the playing of these pieces, a ritual specialist would dance in rhythm with the music calling on the help of ancestral spirits (tunong).

=== Sulu-type kulintangan compositions ===
Sulu-type compositions on the kulintangan are found among the Tausug, Samal, Yakan, Sama/Badjao, Iranun and Kadazan-Dusun. Though there exist no identifiable rhythmic or melodic differences between patterns with names such as the Maguindanao, each group has their own music compositions. For instance, the Tausug have three identifiable compositions: kuriri, sinug, and lubak-lubak; the Yakan have two: tini-id and kuriri; and the Dusun have three: ayas, kudidi and tidung. Though these melodies vary even within groups like the Maguindanao and Maranao, one theme which characterizes the Sulu-type is the exchange of short melodic phrases between the kulintangan and the agung, where both instruments imitate and duplicate each other's rhythms very quickly. This is clearly seen in the Tausug sinug and Yakan tini-id and kuriri compositions where this sort of jousting becomes a game of skill and virtuosic playing.

=== Composition titles ===
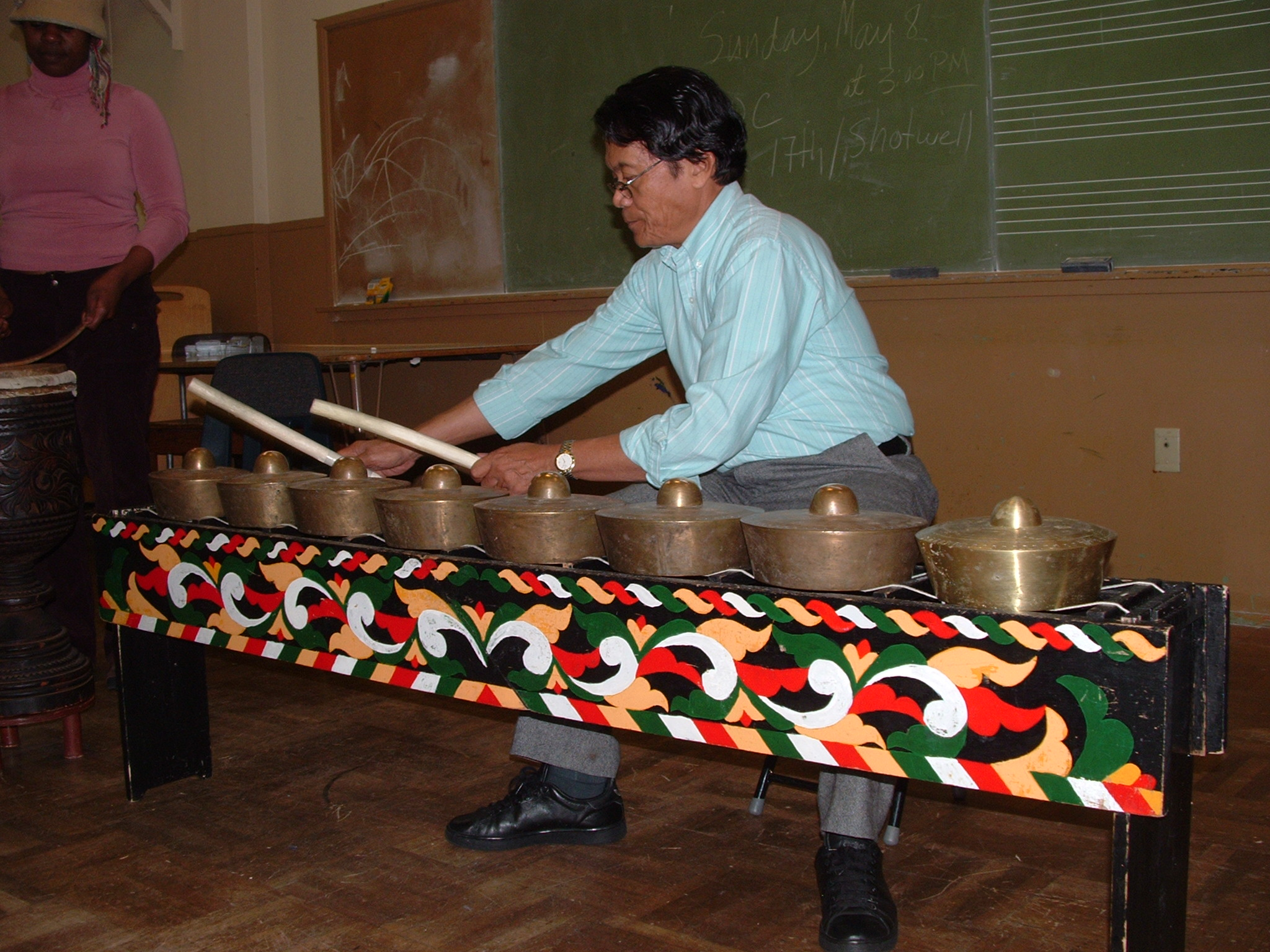
Kulintang

The kulintang repertoire has no fixed labels because the music itself is not considered a fixed entity. Due to the fact it is orally transmitted, the repertoire itself is considered something always in a state of flux due to two primary reasons. First, standardized titles weren't considered a priority. Though to the musicians themselves the melodies would sound similar, the labels they would place on a particular rhythmic mode or style could vary even from household to household within that same village. For the musicians, the emphasis is on the excitement and pleasure of playing the music without much regard to what the piece was referred to as. Secondly, because musicians improvised their pieces regularly, modes and styles were continually revised and changed as they were passed on to a newer generation of musicians, making the pieces and therefore the labels attached to them relevant only during a certain frame of time.

Such issues made attempts to codify the compositions in a uniform manner impossible. An example of this could be found among the Maguindanao where the word binalig is used by contemporary musicians as a name for one of the rhythmic modes associated with kangungudan but it has also been used as a term designating a “new” style. Another example concerns the discrepancy among “old” and “new” genres. With “new pieces” continuously proliferating even up till now, pieces only created decades ago are now considered “old” even though this is considered a tradition spanning many centuries. These differences could sometimes make discussing this repertoire and the modes and styles within it a bit confounding.

== Composition of various ensembles ==
The makeup of kulintang ensembles throughout the region varies between the various cultural groups. Generally, they consist of five to six instruments dominated of course by a melody-playing gong row that functions as a lead/central melodic instrument for the entire ensemble.

Group and their ensemble name		Horizontal gongs	Suspended gongs	Drums	Other gong or drum	Other gong or drum
Maguindanaon	Basalen, palabunibuniyan	Kulintang	Agung	Dabakan	Babandil (gong)	Gandingan (gong)
Maranao	Kolintang	Kolintang	Agong	Dbakan, gandang (*archaic)	Babndir (gong)	
Tausug/Suluk	Kulintangan	Kulintangan	Tunggalan	Gandang (two), libbit	Pulakan(Duahan) (gong)	Buahan, duahan (gong)
Samal	Kulintangan	Kulintangan	Tamuk	Tambul, Gandang	Pulakan(Duahan) (gong)	Bua, duahan (gong)
Sama/Badjao	Batitik	Kulintangan	Gong Besar	Gandang		Bandil (gong)
Yakan	Kwintangan	Kwintangan	Agung			slit drum
Minahasa	Kolintang	Kolintang	Banding	Double-headed drums		
Malays	Kulintangan	Kulintangan	Agong	Gendang		Tawak-Tawak (gong)
Lotud	Mojumbak	Kulintangan	Tawag-Tawag	Gendang		
Iban/Sea Dayaks	Engkromong	Engkromong	Tetawak	Dumbak		Bandai (gong)
Ternate	Kulintang, remoi sahi-sahi	Momo	Saragi	Baka-baka	Podo (drum)	Dabi-dabi, cik (cymbals)
Tidore	Jalanpong	Momo	Saragi	Baka-baka	Podo (drum)	Dabi-dabi, cik (cymbals)
Ambon	Totobuang	Totobuang		Tifa, tifus	Drums	

== Gallery ==
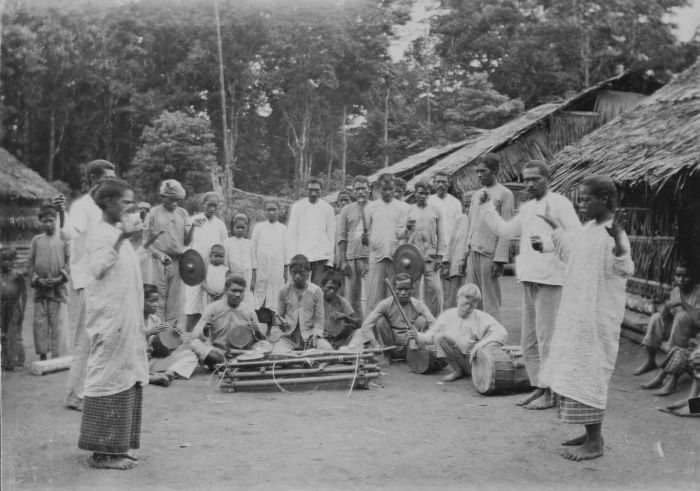
Two dancers and a group of musicians of Kulintang in Buru Regency, Maluku, Indonesia. between 1900 and 1940

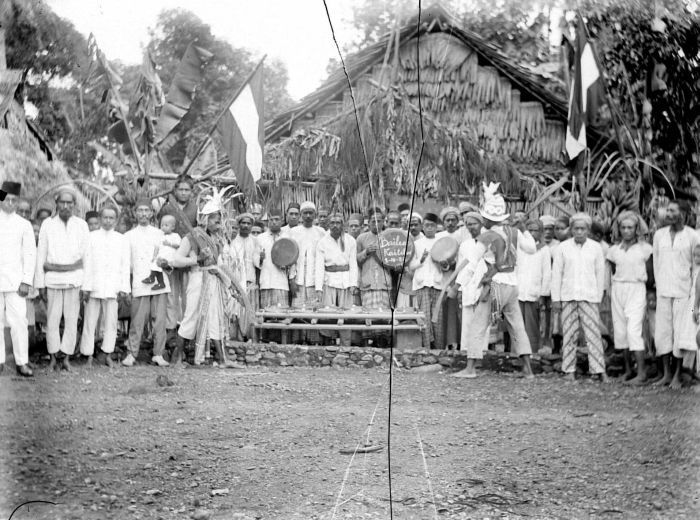
Group portrait of Ambonese with musical instrument of Kulintang in Ambon, Maluku, Indonesia. between 1900 and 1940

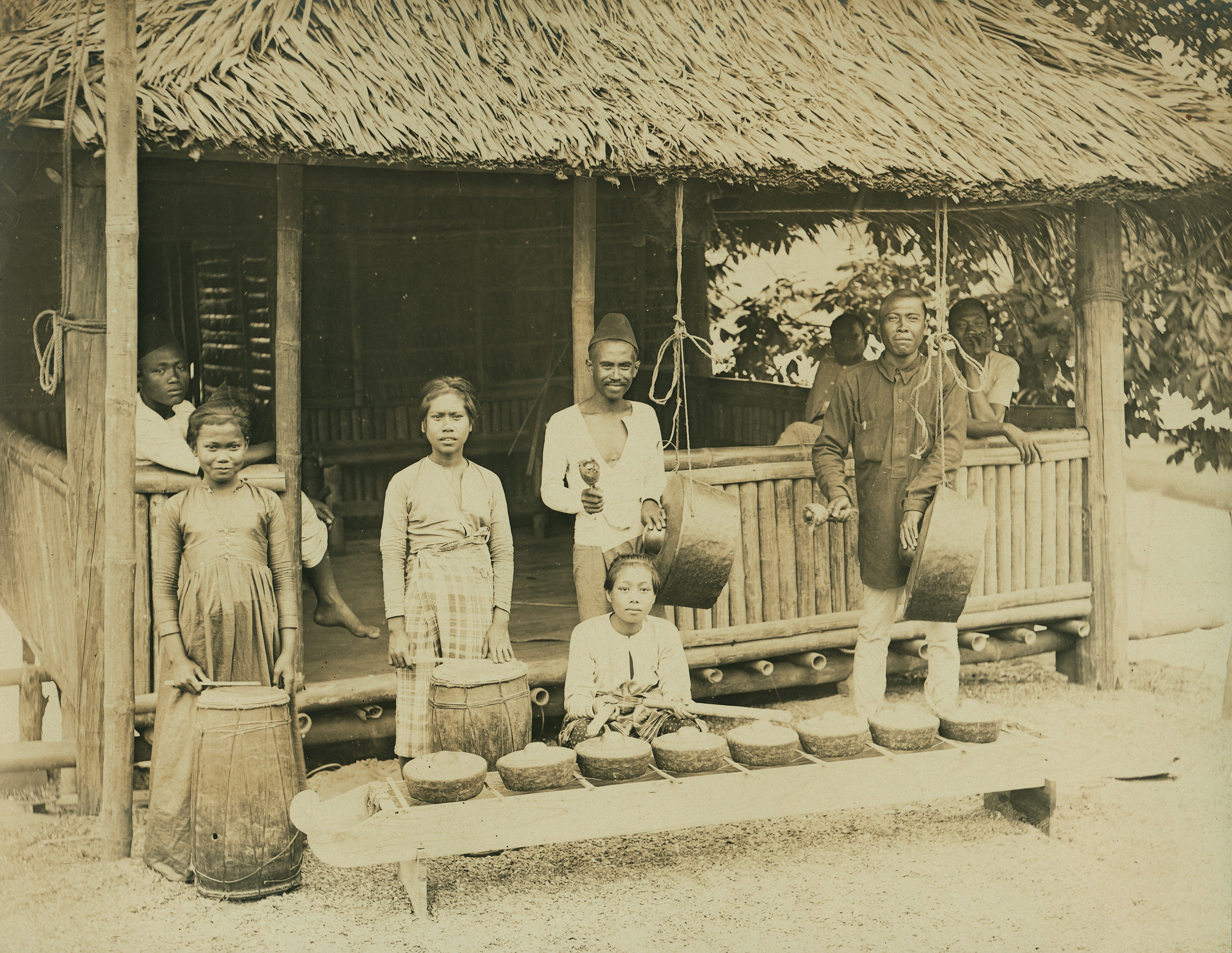
Sama-Bajau musicians at the Philippine Reservation of the Louisiana Purchase Exposition (1904)

== See also ==
- Maguindanao kulintang ensemble
- Gamelan
- Piphat
- Gong
