= Bertitik =

Bajau traditional musical ensemble

- Stylistic origins: Music of Malaysia
- Cultural origins: Malaysia

Bertitik is the traditional folk music of the Sama-Bajau in Kota Belud, Sabah. According to the Kamus Dewan, bertitik means to beat or to forge. Bertitik will be played during the wedding ceremony, the evening before the henna night and during the henna night. This musical ensemble serves as a signal to inform the villagers of the ongoing ceremony. However, Bertitik will not be played when there is hardship or death in the village until the death period has passed for 40 days.

== Instruments ==
The musical instruments used in Bertitik are gendang, gongs, bebandil, and kulintangan. These four musical instruments serve as one ensemble in the ceremony. If any of these musical instruments are not used, the ensemble will not produce a pleasant sound. This musical instrument will be played by those who are skilled in using it only.

== See also ==
- gendang
