= Pleun =

Pleun is a unisex given name. Notable people with the name include:

- Pleun Bierbooms (born 1998), Dutch singer
- Pleun van Leenen (1901–1982), Dutch long-distance runner
- Pleun Raaijmakers (born 1997), Dutch footballer
- Pleun Strik (1944–2022), Dutch footballer

== See also ==
- Lam pleun, a genre of Laotian music
