= Tagonggo =

Philippine musical style

In Sulu, tagonggo or tagunggo is a type of music traditionally played by male musicians dressed in their festive fineries. Tagonggo is associated with the Sama, Bajau, and Tausug ethnicities.

"Taggungo Ver. 1"
This sample of Taggungo is used only to accompany healing rituals with trance dancers performing the dance Sagayan.

It is considered to be outdoor music, while the related kulintang ensemble, by contrast, is chamber music. The main instrument of tagonggo music is the tagungguan. The tagungguan consists of six to eight hanging pentatonic gongs.

In addition, the instrumental ensemble consists of a number of medium-sized gongs called mamalala; several small, high pitched, and shallow gongs called pong; one or more tambor (snare drums); and one or more garagara or pandaupan (cymbals).

Occasions or purposes for playing tagonggo include sending off or welcoming dignitaries, honorific serving of betel quid, and wedding celebrations. Tagonggo players go at the head of the parade either on foot or aboard a vehicle or motorboat. Tagonggo is also played in ceremonies called kalilang sa tong to appeal to the spirits for a bountiful harvest or for a rich catch of fish.

== See also ==
- Pangalay
