= Music of Southeast Asia =

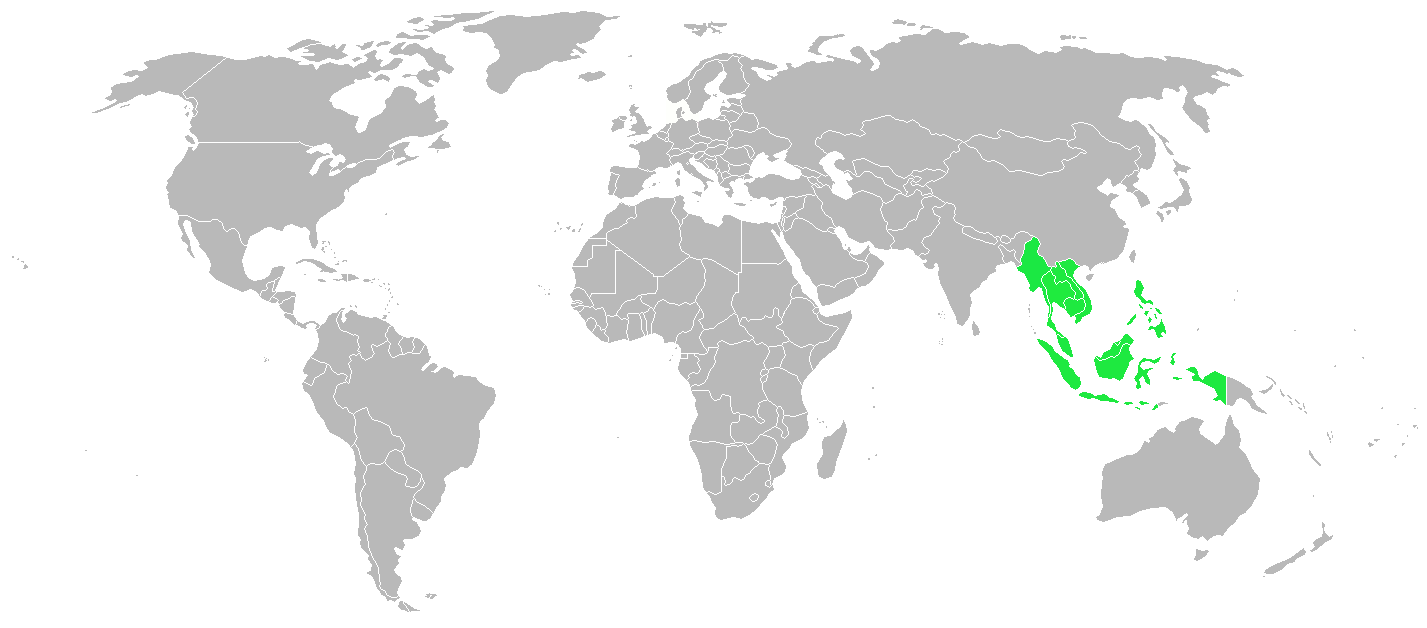
Location of Southeast Asia

Southeast Asian music encapsulates numerous musical traditions and styles in many countries of Southeast Asia. This subregion consists of eleven countries, namely, Brunei, Cambodia, Indonesia, Laos, Malaysia, Myanmar, the Philippines, Singapore, Thailand, Timor-Leste and Vietnam, which accommodate hundreds of ethnic groups. Thousands of styles of music are present as a result of regional groups speaking many languages all over the subregion of Asia. Regionalism is usually accepted and celebrated, however, it is sometimes suppressed by the people, even though countries from Southeast Asia are trying to construct national cultures. Hinduism, Buddhism, Islam, and Christianity are the paramount faiths in Southeast Asia. Throughout history to the present time, instrumental and vocal music has been centralized and focused on the religious life of subregional Asia. Urbanization has helped to assimilate musical and religious practices. Although modernization has put a significant threat on the distinctive regional music traditions, most countries in the region have maintained their own unique style and nature of music that encapsulates various periods of development in music, culture, and belief.

== See also ==
- Music of Brunei
- Music of Cambodia
- Music of Indonesia
  - Music of Bali
  - Music of Sunda
  - Music of Java
  - Music of Sumatra
- Music of Laos
- Music of Malaysia
- Music of Myanmar
- Music of the Philippines
  - P-pop
  - Philippine folk music
  - Pinoy rock
  - Pinoy hip-hop
  - Pinoy reggae
- Music of Singapore
- Music of Thailand
- Music of Timor-Leste
- Music of Vietnam
