= Maguindanao kulintang ensemble =

Ethnic musical ensemble

The Maguindanao kulintang ensemble, called basalen or palabunibuniyan is the traditional gong chime ensemble of the Maguindanao. Other forms of the kulintang ensembles are played in parts of Southeast Asia especially in the eastern parts of Maritime Southeast Asia — southern Philippines, eastern Indonesia, eastern Malaysia, Brunei and Timor.

== History ==
Inetog: kulintang before sultanate period (1380)

Inantang: Horizontally arranged (inantang) form of kulintang played by beginners for practice, like the inetog. Developed during the Spanish colonial period and utilized up to the end of the American period, it does not require a stand, instead padded by mats (ikam) or soft clothing (malmek a banggala) on the floor to produce better sounds.

Inubad: Developed in 1942 during the Japanese occupation and forms the basis of the modern kulintang. Consists of eight gongs like the previous forms, but suspended on a rectangular antangan (rack) tied with strings and are exclusively circular.

Galang: Considered the most prestigious and expensive form of kulintang developed in the late 1940’s, shortly after the Japanese occupation. Like the inubad, the eight gongs of the galang are only circular, but are exclusively cast in bronze and golden in color.

== Instrumentation ==
The palabunibuniyan has five instruments, consisting an array of bossed gongs and one drum. Today, most gongs in the ensemble are cast in brass, drawing from a huge supply of leftover scrap metal from World War II. Historically, bronze was the typical metal of choice and was imported from Borneo; this trade was completely disrupted during the war and remains in limbo.

- Kulintang: Set of five to nine bossed gongs typically suspended on a horizontal frame (pasangan). Pitch is arranged left to right from lowest to highest, each gong slightly decreasing in size. Tuning is not standardized, instead it varies according to an individual player’s preferences. The gongs are played by beating the boss with wooden sticks aligned perpendicular to the rack, and functions as the primary melodic instrument of the ensemble.
- Babandil: Single, narrow-rimmed gong played as the timekeeper of the ensemble. It is typically 1 foot in diameter, comparable in size to the gandingan and agung gongs and has a distinctively sunken boss, rendering it non-functional. It is only played on its rim beaten by a long, narrow wooden stick (betay). In this regard, it is technically considered a bell, or a “false gong” instead of a gong.
- Gandingan: Set of four large thin-rimmed bossed gongs vertically hung horizontally on a standing frame. It is played by beating its boss with wooden mallets wrapped in rubber (balu) on their ends. In a basalen, it is played as a secondary melodic instrument behind the kulintang. When played solo, it functioned as a communicative device.
- Agung: Paired set of two large, wide-rimmed bossed gongs, vertically suspended on a standing frame and played by beating its boss with balus, similar to the gandingan. It only functions as the bass of the ensemble.
- Dabakan: Standing single-headed drum that is typically either hour-glass, goblet, tubular, and/or conical in shape, and is the only instrument in the palabunibuniyan that is not a gong. It is played on its drumhead by two long narrow rattan or bamboo sticks. Its shell is carved from either coconut or jackfruit tree trunks and its drumhead from goatskin, carabao hide, deerhide, snakeskin, or lizard skin - the last two considered the best material. The drumhead is tightly fastened to the shell using two hooped weaves of rattan, allowing the sticks to bounce cleanly. The dabakan is primarily played as a supporting instrument maintaining tempo, similar to the babandil.

== See also ==
- Music of the Philippines
- Music of Malaysia
  - Malay gamelan
- Music of Brunei
- Music of Indonesia
  - Kolintang of North Sulawesi
  - Talempong of West Sumatra
  - Gamelan
    - List of gamelan varieties
- Piphat of Thailand
- Pinphat of Laos
- Pinpeat of Cambodia
- Hsaing waing of Myanmar
