= Babendil =

Philippine gong

Babandil
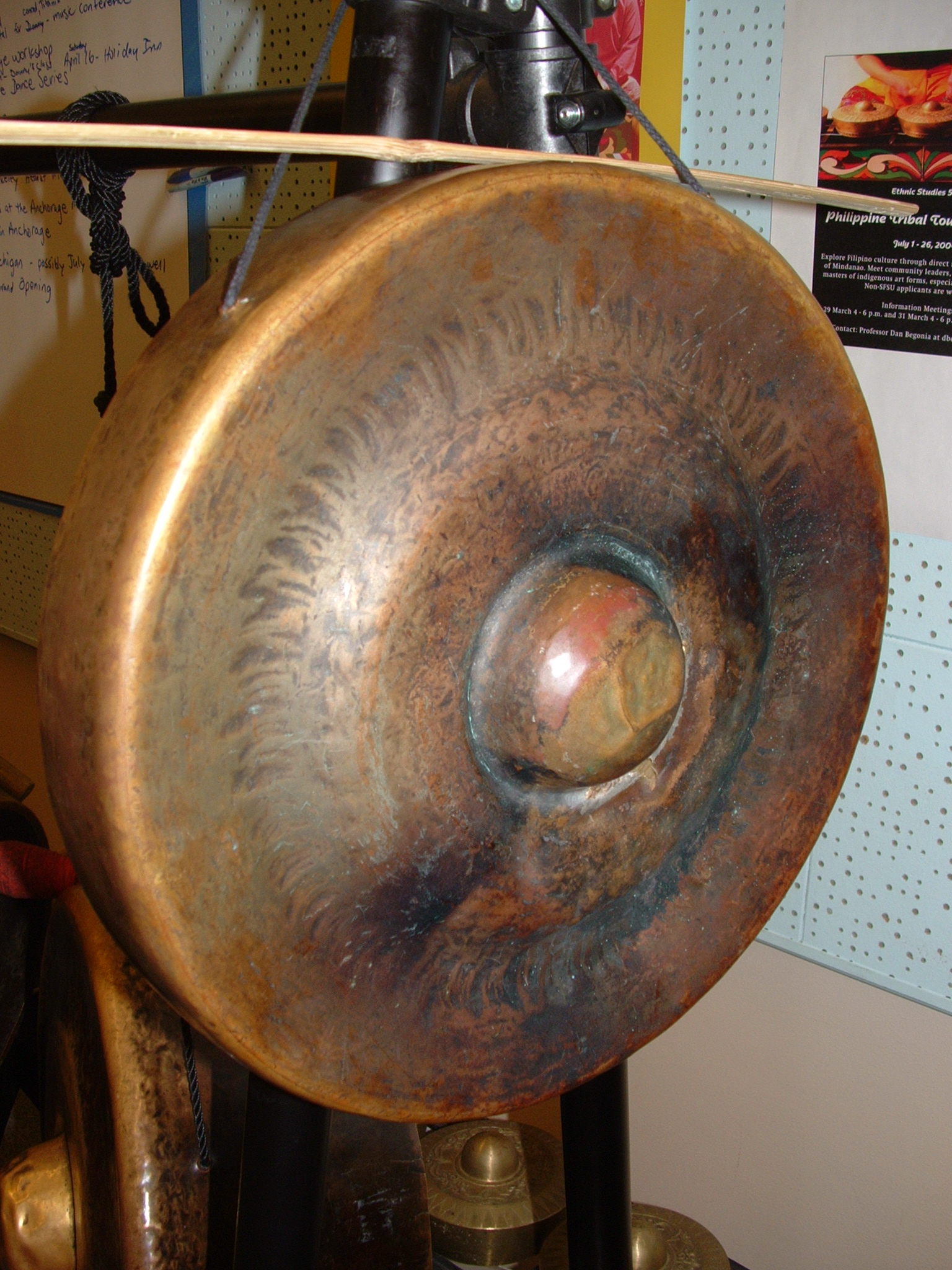

Percussion instrument
- Classification: Idiophone
- Hornbostel–Sachs classification: 111.241.1 (Gong)
- Developed: Indonesia

The babandil is a single, narrow-rimmed Philippine gong used primarily as the “timekeeper” of the Maguindanao kulintang ensemble.

== Description ==
The babendil usually has a diameter of roughly one foot making it larger than the largest kulintang gong and comparable to the diameter of the agung or gandingan. However, unlike the gandingan or the agong, the babendil has a sunken boss which makes the boss relatively non-functional. Because of their sunken boss, babendils are instead struck either at the flange or the rim, using either bamboo betays or a strip of rattan, producing a sharp, distinctive metallic clang and are sometimes considered “false gongs.” In fact, this distinction makes the babendil classified as a bell in the Hornbostel-Sachs classification (if it were struck at the boss, it would be considered a gong.)

Babandils are normally made out of bronze but due to the scarcity of this metal in Mindanao, most gongs, including the babendil are made out of more common metal such as brass, iron and even tin-can.

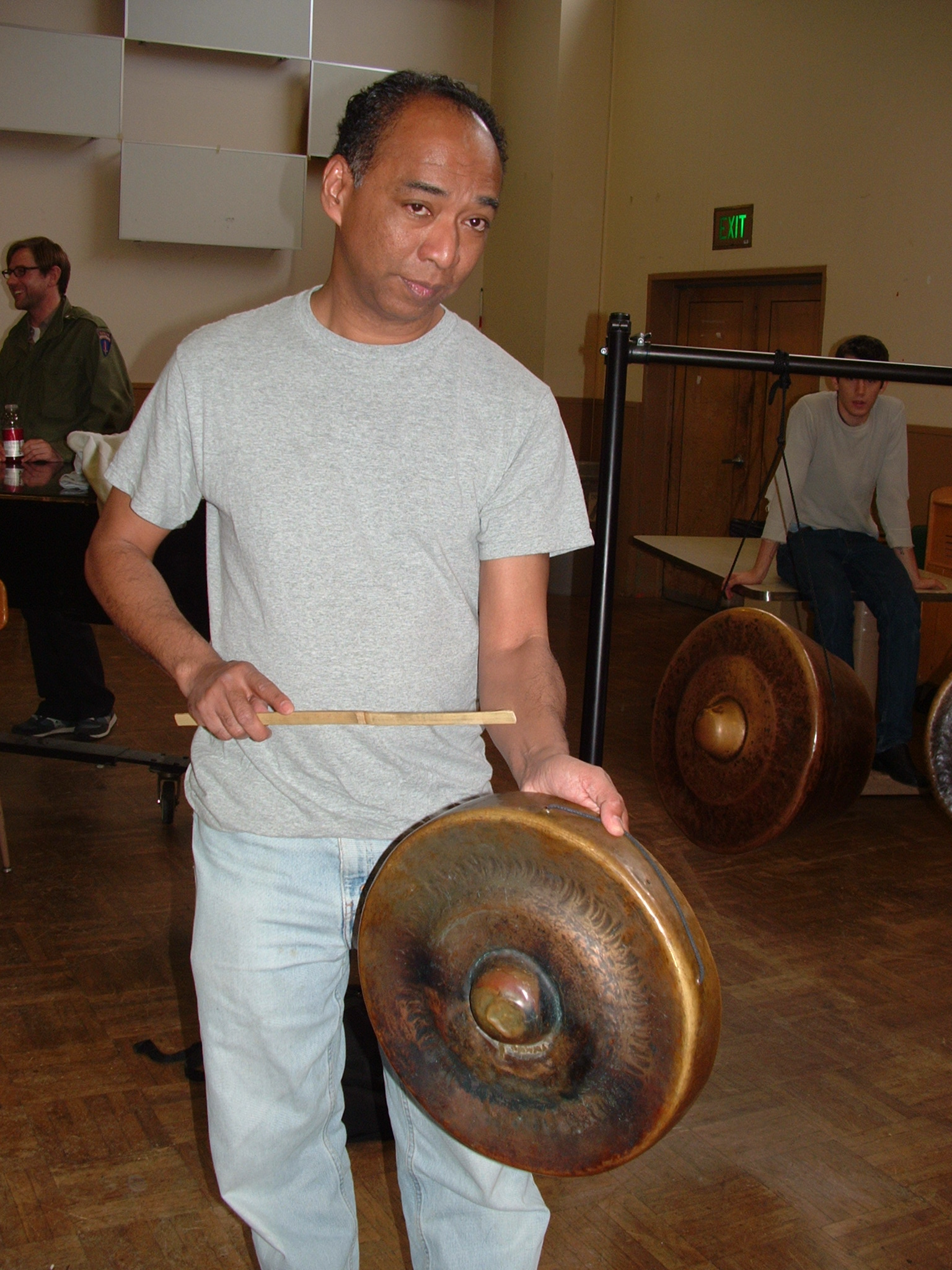
Student demonstrating the proper way to use the babendil

== Technique ==
The babendil could be played while standing or when seated with the babendil hung half a foot from the floor. Proper technique requires the player to hold the babendil vertically, angled away from the body, with the gong held at the rim between their thumb and four fingers. With their thumb parallel to the rim of the gong, the players strikes the rim of the gong using their betay to play fundamental patterns that are similar to the drum pattern on the dabakan or the beat of the lower-pitched agung.

== Uses ==
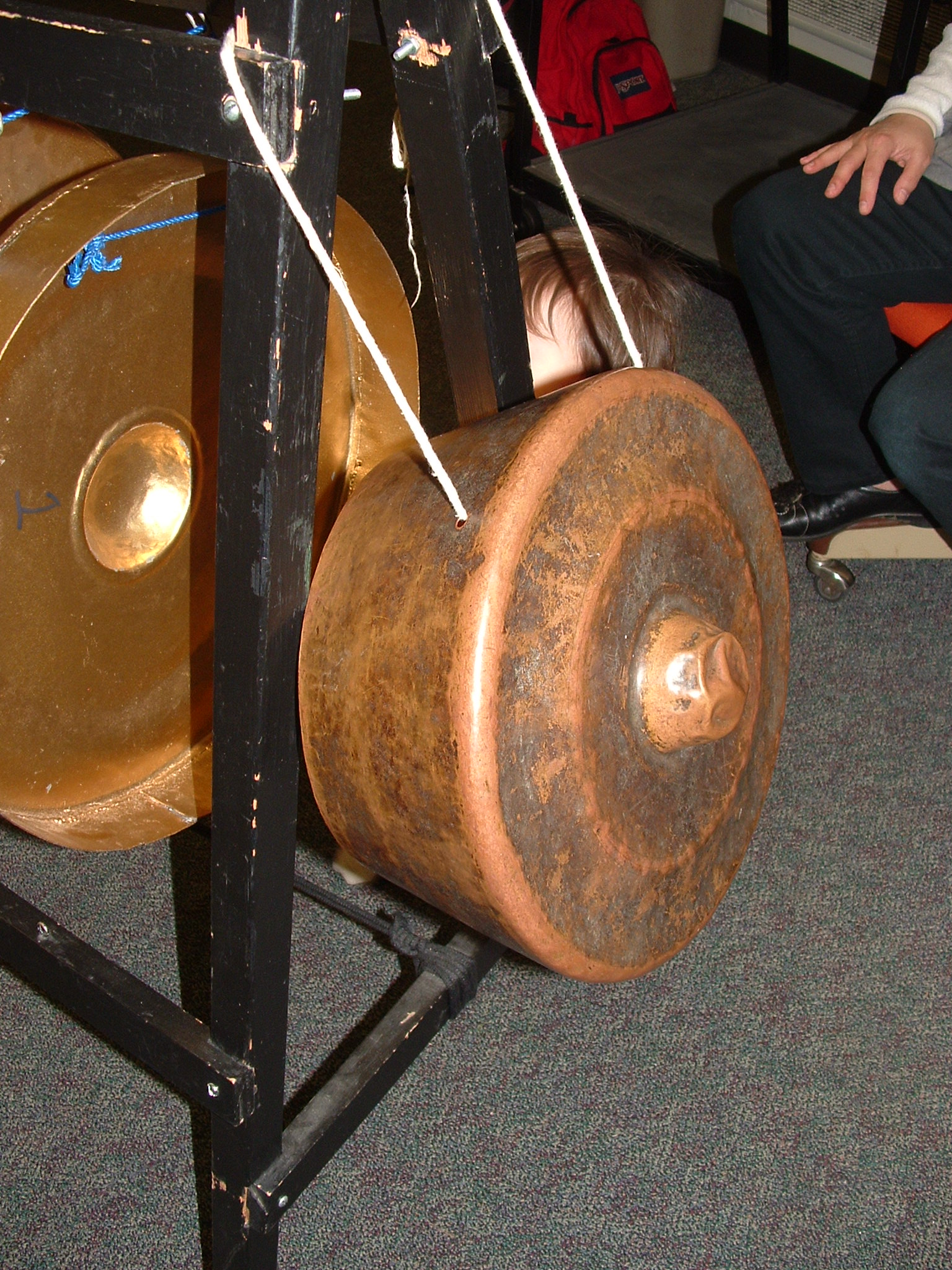
The babendil

The babendil traditionally could be played by either genders. In wooden kulintang ensembles, the kagul is usually substituted for the babendil part. Among the Tausug, the Samal and the Yakan, their babendil-type instrument generally has gone into disuse (Instead, tempo is kept in check using the highest gong on the kulintangan . Solembat is term used by the Samal for the ostinato beat while the Yakan call that same beat, nulanting.) while among the Tagbanwa, the babandil is used not only to keep the rhythm of pieces but also as a song accompaniment as well.

== Origins ==
The origins of the word "babendil" could either be traced from the Middle East or the Indian Subcontinent. Scholars suggest the name babendil is derived from the Arabic word, bandair, meaning, “circular-type, pan-Arabic, tambourine or frame drum." Others suggests that since the babendil is closely related to the Javanese bebende or bende (a gong with similar characteristics and uses in the colotomic gamelan ensemble), it perhaps has relations with an ancient Indian kettle drum, behri, where ancient Sanskrit indicated the bende was the bronze equivalent of the behri.

== Other derivative names ==
Also called: babendir, (Maguindanao) babndir (Maranao), bandil, babandil, babindil, bapindil, (Other Southern Philippine Groups), babandir (Tagbanwa, Batak, Palaw’an), banendir, tungtung, (Tausug), salimbal (Samal) and the mapindil (Yakan).
