= Music of Laos =

The music of Laos includes the music of the Lao people, a Tai ethnic group, and other ethnic groups living in Laos. The traditional music of Laos has similarities with the traditional music of Thailand and Cambodia, including the names of the instruments and influences and developments. To categorize Lao music, it can be distinguished between the nonclassical folk traditions (which are presented through the ensembles and instruments used within), the classical music traditions and its basic ensembles, and vocal traditions.

== Classical music ==
The term ເພງລາວເດີມ "peng Lao deum" (traditional Lao songs) describes the Royal Court music of Laos. Historical records indicate that an indigenous classical tradition existed, which was mainly influenced by ancient Khmer traditions and mountainous ethnic groups. King Fa Ngum was raised and educated in Angkor Wat, so the Khmer traditions were the first center for the court music, which evolved and changed as the Lao kingdom grew.

Performers in Tennessee, USA tried to rebuild court music in diaspora and failed due to a lack of members. The classical ensemble and its instruments get used in traditions, are only used for the "lam" traditions and the only "theater" like traditions "li-ke" (or "lam poem", from 1940) which immigrated from northern Siam, gets performed with acting, storytelling in "lam" singing styles and a Khene mouth organ.

== Mor lam ==
Lao morlam / molam, sometimes referenced with "lam" followed by the beat/genre name when naming the song in Laos (Lao: ລຳ) is considered purer and more traditional than the forms found in Thailand. It features the khaen (Lao: ແຄນ) (bamboo and reed mouth organ) and jousting pairs of singers, backed by troupes, who improvise stories and courting duels.

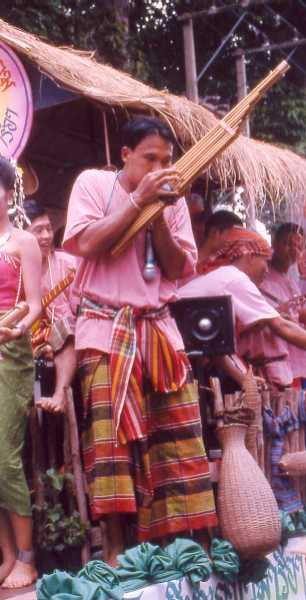
A khene player in Isan.

Ensembles may include 2 singers (mor lam, the same term referring to the genre of music)— 1 male and 1 female—, a khene player (mor khaen), and other instruments including fiddles, flutes and bells.

== Regional music ==
Each of these traditions is influenced by regional playing styles, which can be separated in 3 areas: Luang Prabang in the north, Vientiane in the center, and Champassak in the south.

=== Luang Prabang ===
In Luang Prabang, classical Lao court music developed to "high estate and vanished". Most of the instruments are collecting dust in the royal museum, and showpieces like bronze drums of the Dong Son age show the influence of ethnic minorities which were mostly from the mountainous areas.

=== Vientiane ===
In Vientiane the governmental school "Natasin" which was closed 1975 was reopened 1990 and educates and provides some ensembles for festivals, marriages and other purposes.

=== Champasak ===
The southern region of Champassak is not only influenced by Khmer traditions, and may be a mixture of Khmer, Thai and indigenous Lao traditions.

== Popular music ==
In the 1960s, lam nu and lam ploen contributed to the development of lam luang, which is a form of song (and dance) which sometimes has narrative lyrics.

== Instruments ==
- A musical instrument is a bamboo mouth organ called a khene. The instrument was supposedly invented by a woman trying to imitate the calls of the garawek bird. The woman took the instrument to her king, and he told her it was fair, and that he wanted more. She modified the instrument and he replied "Tia nee khaen dee" (this time it was better).
