= Lam ploen =

Lam ploen (or lam pleun) is a genre of Laotian music, deriving from Iser theater traditions. Since the 1960s and 1970s, lam ploen has become increasingly popular as a song genre, divorced from the theater and with the influence of luk thung singing styles.
