= Sagayan =

Philippine war dance

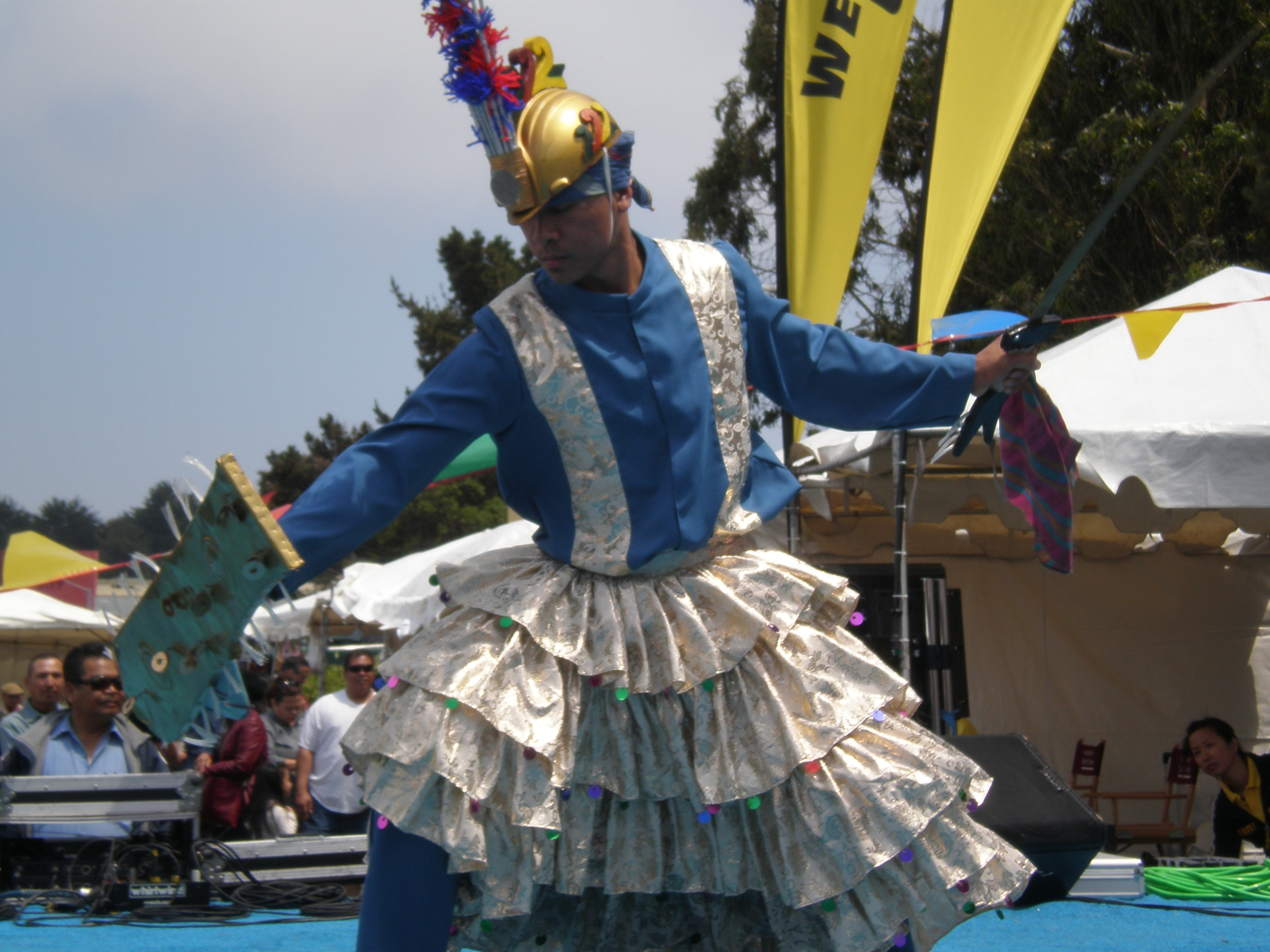
A man performing Sagayan at the 14th Annual Fil-Am Friendship Celebration at Daly City, California

Sagayan is a Philippine war dance performed by Maguindanao, Maranao, and Iranun depicting in dramatic fashion the steps their hero, Prince Bantugan, took upon wearing his armaments, the war he fought in and his subsequent victory afterwards. Performers, depicting fierce warriors, would carry shields with shell noisemakers in one hand and a kampilan sword on the other.

Dancers of the Sagayan wear atypical costumes based on mythological descriptions of Bantugan's equipment in the epic Darangen. He was described as wearing the kapasti (a headdress with embedded mirrors), clothes with the colors of the rainbow, a klong (shield) made of the hardest wood and with small bells, a blindingly shiny kampilan (a large double-tipped war sword) tied to the wrist with five or seven holes decorated with animal hair, and a magerag (a shorter secondary sword). Among the Maguindanao people, the kapasti is usually interpreted as a sayap (a traditional conical headdress), brightly colored and decorated with feathers, mirrors, and tassels. The clothing is interpreted as a three-tiered skirt of red, green, and yellow.

The name "sagayan" is a loanword and comes from the Tausug word sagay, meaning "headhunter."

== See also ==
- Darangen
