= Music of Brunei =

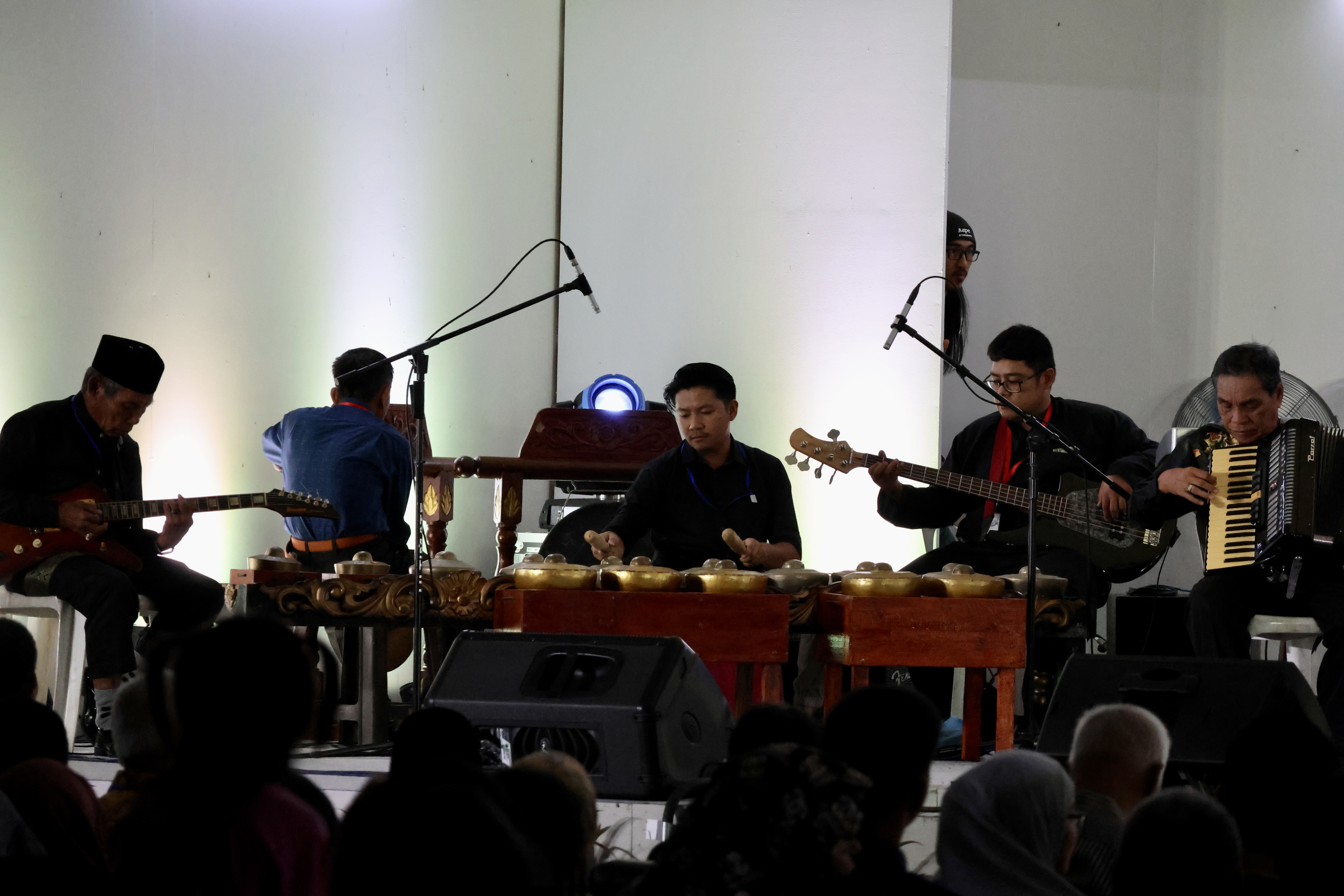
Brunei musicians with a mix of modern and traditional musical instruments in 2023.

Brunei is a southeast Asian country located on Borneo between the states of Sabah and Sarawak which are part of Malaysia. There is a wide array of native folk music, and dance. Brunei shares some Cultural perspectives and links with the countries of Southeast Asia such as Malaysia, Singapore, Indonesia, Thailand, and the Philippines. The strong Islamic influence means that dance performances and music are somewhat restricted.

== Folk music ==
Adai-adai is a group work song sung by fisherpeople while they fished. Another folk dance is the Benari, or Joget Baju Putih, performed during numerous festivals. It is usually performed by three men and three women.

=== Kedayan music ===
Aduk-Aduk is a ceremonial dance performing by the Kedayan children before birthdays, especially at the end of the harvest season. Dancers wear traditional warrior's attire, in tengkolok, red belt and black clothing, and dance to the beat of silat, a Malay martial art. This dance is accompanied by percussion instruments, including drums and coconut shells.

The Malay population are known for the Jipin or Zapin dance, performed by six men and women, accompanied by instruments that include the gambus dan biola, dombak and rebana. Gongs like the Kulintangan (a set of small gongs), duck gongs and other styles are played. Malay folk music is played by accomplished musicians at special feasts and celebrations. Responsive singing is sometimes performed at weddings, with the guests joining in. The song "Alus Jua Dindang" is also an important part of Bruneian wedding music; in it, the groom (who, in a traditional wedding does not know the bride beforehand), flatters and declares his devotion to his new wife.

== Music institutions ==
The Brunei Music Society has been organising concerts of mainly Western classical music since its founding in 1972. These concerts are usually held at the Orchid Garden Hotel in BSB.
