= Minangkabau culture =

Culture of the Minangkabau people

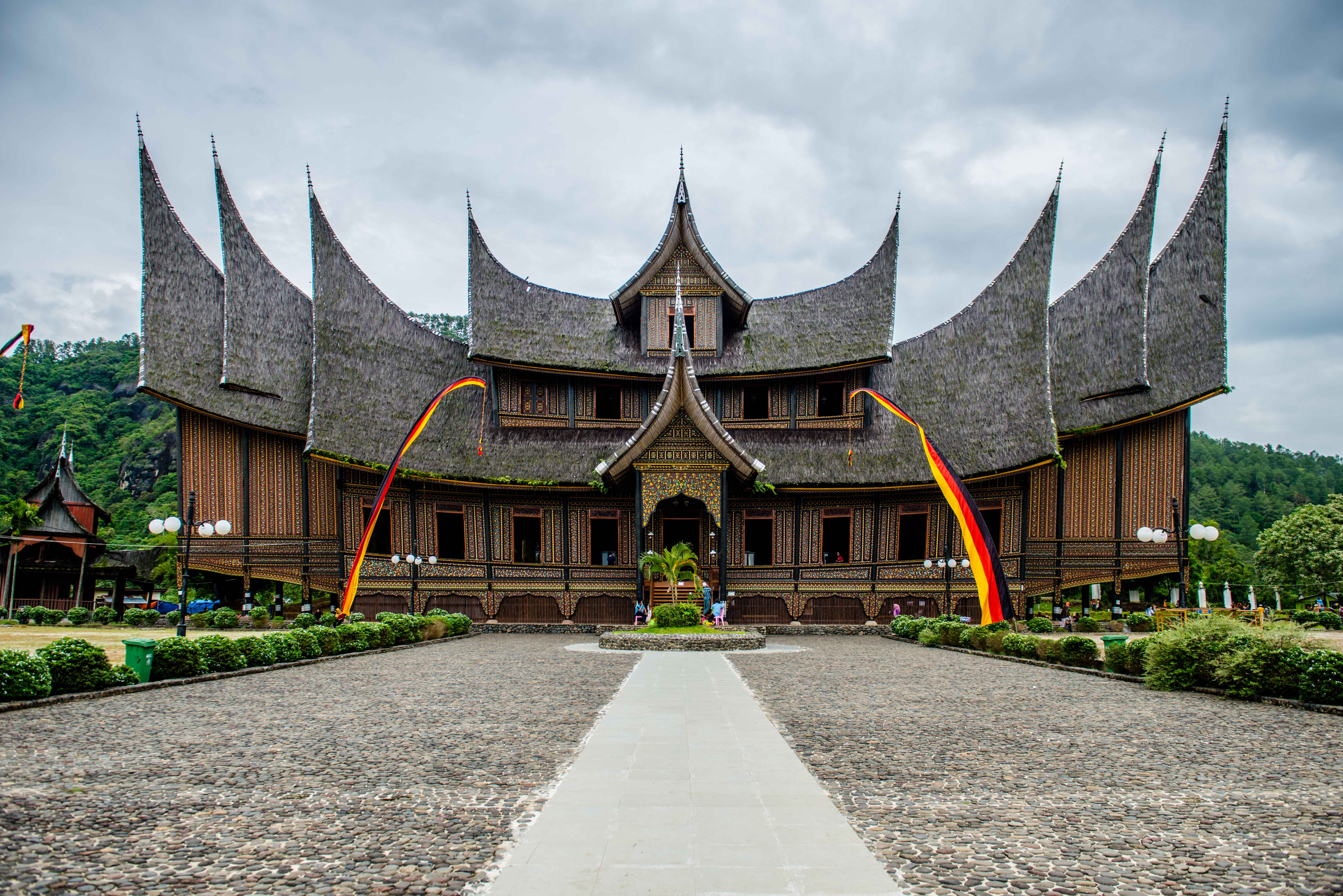
Pagaruyung Palace, is the istana (royal palace) of the former Pagaruyung Kingdom. It was built in the traditional Minangkabau Rumah Gadang vernacular architectural style.

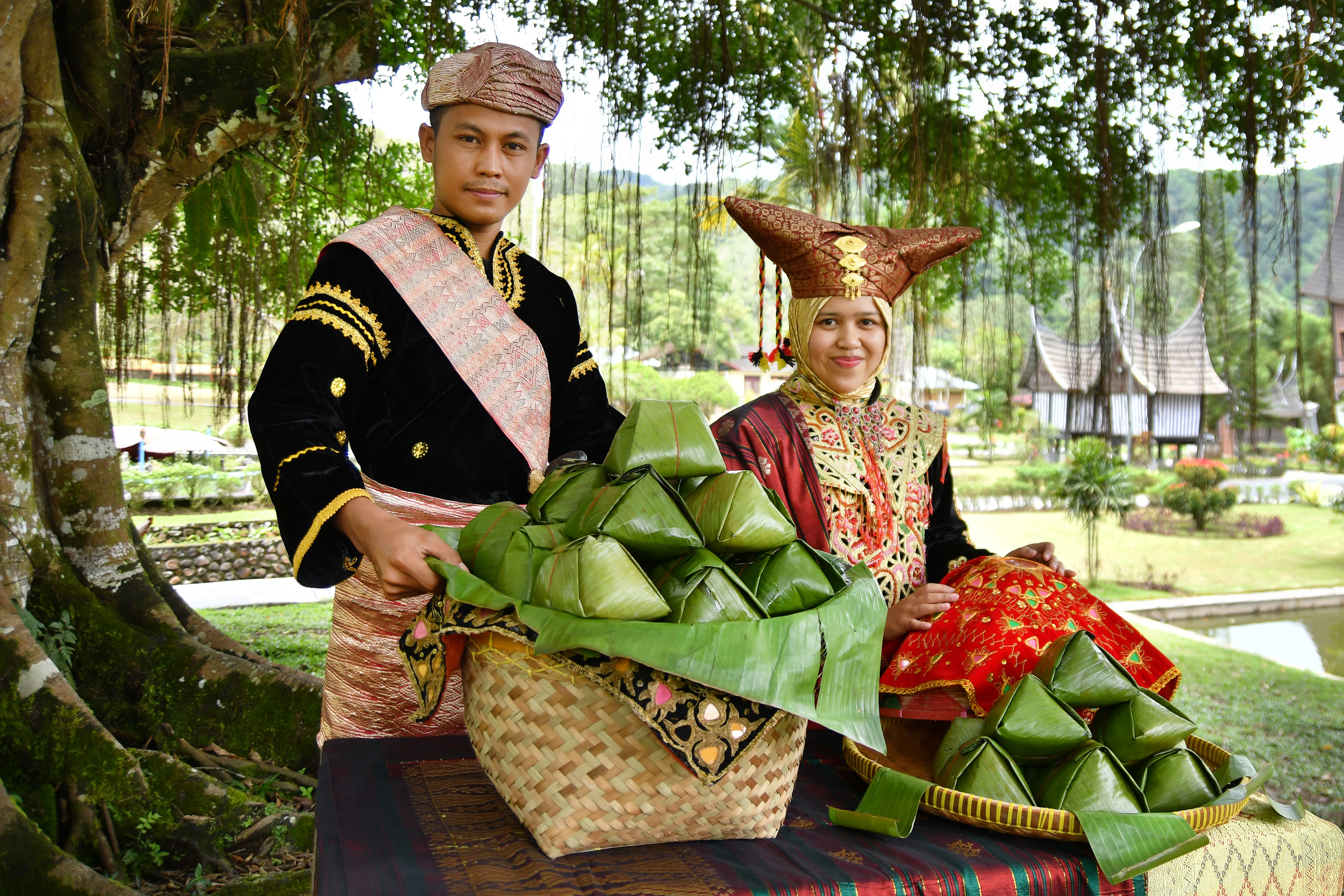
Minangkabau people wearing traditional dress and serving Kabaka rice with Rumah adat background

Minangkabau culture (Minangkabau: budayo Minangkabau) is one of the native Sumatran cultures, it encompass the culture of the Minangkabau – the indigenous Indonesian people native to the Indonesian island of Sumatra (most specifically in Western Sumatra). This culture is one of the major cultures in the Sumatran sphere.

Minangkabau culture adheres to a matrilineal system in terms of marriage, ethnicity, inheritance, and customary titles. The Minangkabau people survive as the world's largest matrilineal adherents. The principles of Minangkabau custom in modern-days are contained in the statement of "Adaik basandi syarak, syarak basandi Kitabullah" (lit. 'the [Minangkabau] customs have to be Islamic (Sharia), [and those] Islamic [means] have to be based on Quran'), refers to the Islamized-based customary laws that are commonly adhered by the predominant Minangkabau Muslims.

== History ==
Distribution of the Minangkabau community in Sumatra.

Historically, Minangkabau culture originated from Luhak Nan Tigo (Minangkabau Highlands), which then spread to overseas areas in the west, east, north and south of Luhak Nan Tigo. Currently the Minangkabau cultural area covers West Sumatra, western part of Riau (Kampar, Kuantan Singingi, Rokan Hulu), west coast of North Sumatra (Natal, Sorkam, Sibolga, Barus), western part of Jambi (Kerinci, Bungo, Tebo), northern part of Bengkulu (Mukomuko), southwest part of Aceh (Aceh Barat Daya, Aceh Selatan, Aceh Barat, Nagan Raya, Aceh Singkil District).

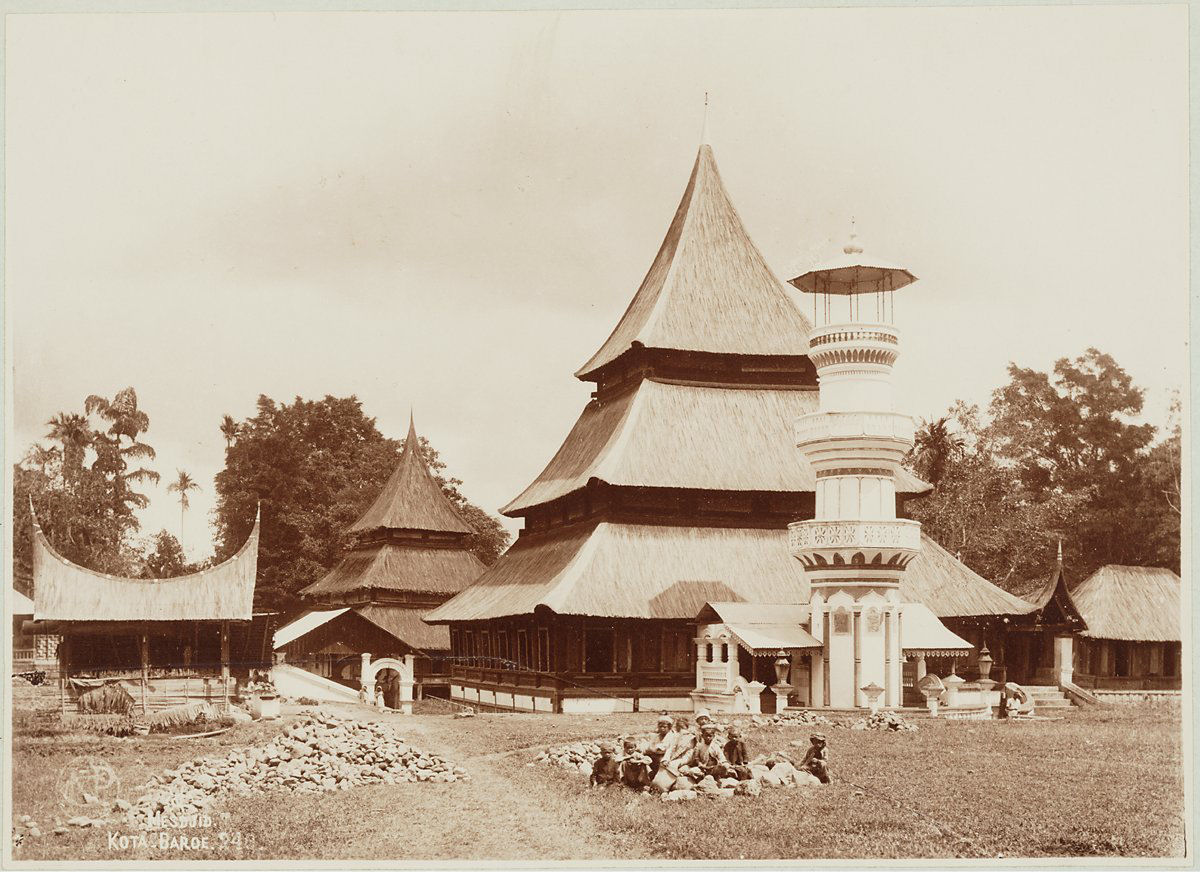
Minangkabau mosque circa 1892–1905 photographed by Christiaan Benjamin Nieuwenhuis

Minangkabau culture was originally characterized by animist and Buddhist cultures. Then since the arrival of Islamic reformers from the Middle East at the end of the 15th century, Minangkabau customs and culture that were not in accordance with Islamic law were abolished. The scholars, spearheaded by Haji Piobang, Haji Miskin, and Haji Sumanik, urged the Indigenous People to change the view of Minang culture that previously had a lot of orientation towards animism and Buddhist culture, to be oriented to Islamic law. The culture of fighting for chickens, fighting buffaloes, gambling, drinking tuak, is forbidden in traditional parties of the Minang community.

Cultural reforms in Minangkabau took place after the Padri War which ended in 1837. This was marked by the agreement on Marapalam Hill between religious scholars, traditional leaders, and cadiak pandai (ingenious clever). They agreed to base Minang cultural customs on Islamic law. The agreement was stated in an adage which reads: Adat basandi syarak, syarak basandi Kitabullah. Syarak mangato adat mamakai (adat according to the Sharia). Since cultural reform in the mid-19th century, the pattern of education and human development in Minangkabau is based on Islamic values. So since then, every village or jorong in Minangkabau has a mosque. Minangkabau youth who have grown up are obliged to sleep in the Surau. In Surau, besides learning the Koran, they also undergo physical training in the form of Silat.

== Cultural products ==
=== Society ===
==== Leadership ====
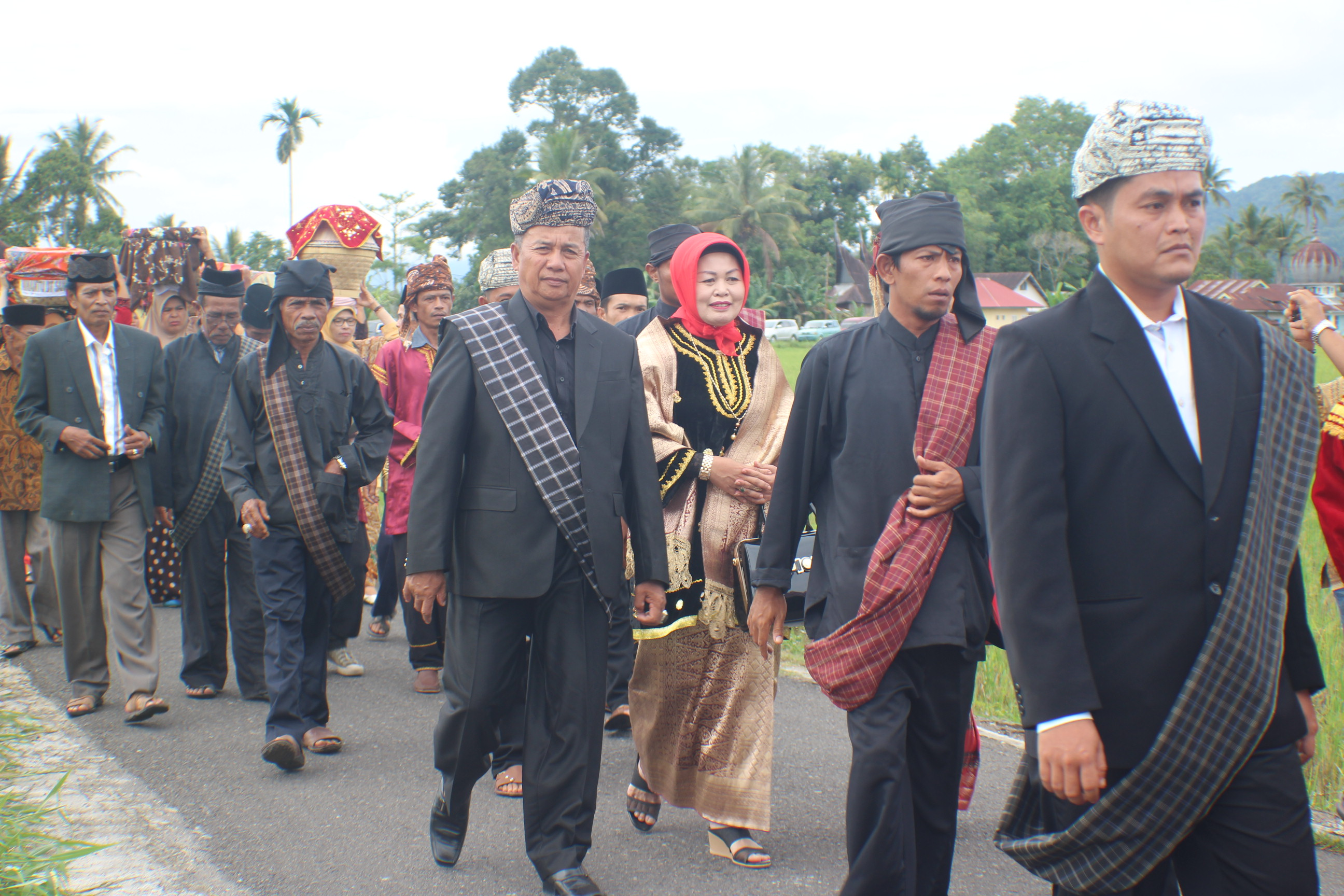
People are marching convoy the New Datuk (leadership) to the venue of the ceremony of Batagak Datuak or Batagak Penghulu in Minangkabau tradition, West Sumatera.

The Minangkabau people have a philosophy that "pemimpin itu hanyalah ditinggikan seranting dan didahulukan selangkah." This means that a leader must be close to the community he leads, and a leader must be ready to be criticized if he makes a mistake. In a concept like this, Minangkabau does not recognize the type of leader who is dictatorial and totalitarian. In addition, the concept of Minangkabau culture, which consists of mini republics, in which the nagari as an autonomous region, has the heads of independent people. They have the same rights and obligations, and are considered equal in society.

With this philosophy, Minangkabau gave birth to many leaders who were trustworthy in various fields, be it politics, economy, culture, and religion. Throughout the twentieth century, the Minangkabau ethnic group was one of the groups of people in Malay archipelago who produced the most leaders and pioneering figures. They include: Tan Malaka, Mohammad Hatta, Yusof Ishak, Tuanku Abdul Rahman, Sutan Sjahrir, Agus Salim, Assaat, Hamka, Mohammad Natsir, Muhammad Yamin, Abdul Halim and others. Based on a relatively small population, Minangkabau is one of the most successful. According to Tempo magazine (2000 New Year special edition), six of the top ten most influential Indonesians of the 20th century were Minang.

==== Democracy ====
A product of Minangkabau culture that also stands out is the democratic attitude of its society. The democratic attitude of the Minang community is due to the fact that the Minangkabau government system consists of many autonomous nagari, where decision-making must be based on deliberation and consensus. Indonesia's 4th president Abdurrahman Wahid and Nurcholish Madjid once affirmed the existence of Minang democracy in Indonesian political culture. The fourth precept of Pancasila, which reads Democracy Led by Wisdom in Deliberation / Representation, is thought to originate from the spirit of Minangkabau democracy, in which the people live in the midst of a represented deliberation.

==== Entrepreneurship ====
Minangkabau people are known as people who have a high entrepreneurial ethos. This is proven by the number of companies and businesses run by Minangkabau entrepreneurs throughout Indonesia. In addition, there are also many Minang businesses that are run in Malaysia and Singapore. Minangkabau entrepreneurs have been trading in Sumatra and the Malacca Strait, at least since the 7th century. Until the 18th century, Minangkabau traders were limited to trading gold and spices. Although there were those who sold weapons to the Kingdom of Malacca, the numbers were not too large. In the early 18th century, many Minangkabau entrepreneurs were successful in trading spices. Now the Minangkabau overseas network, with its various types of business, is one of the successful forms of entrepreneurship in the archipelago. They are a group of entrepreneurs who have quite a large number of assets. In the following years, the Minangkabau entrepreneurial culture also gave birth to big entrepreneurs including Hasyim Ning, Kamarudin Meranun, Abdul Latief, Fahmi Idris, Nasimuddin Amin, and Basrizal Koto. During the New Order era, entrepreneurs from Minangkabau experienced an unfavorable situation due to the lack of support from the New Order rulers to pribumi entrepreneurs.

==== Matrilineage ====
The Minangkabau are the largest matrilineal society in the world, with property, family name and land passing down from mother to daughter, while religious and political affairs are the responsibility of men, although some women also play important roles in these areas. This custom is called Lareh Bodi-Caniago and is known as adat perpatih in Malaysia. Today 4.2 million Minangs live in the homeland of West Sumatra.

As one of the world's most populous (as well as politically and economically influential) matrilineal ethnicities, Minangkabau gender dynamics have been extensively studied by anthropologists. The adat (Minangkabau: Adaik) traditions have allowed Minangkabau women to hold a relatively advantageous position in their society compared to most patriarchal societies, as most property and other economic assets pass through female lines. Minangkabau women hold prominent roles in virtually all spheres of life. Women usually run the household, play prominent public roles, and lead cultural ceremonies and festivals.

When a couple marries, the groom moves into the bride's house as is customary.

=== Art ===
==== Architecture ====
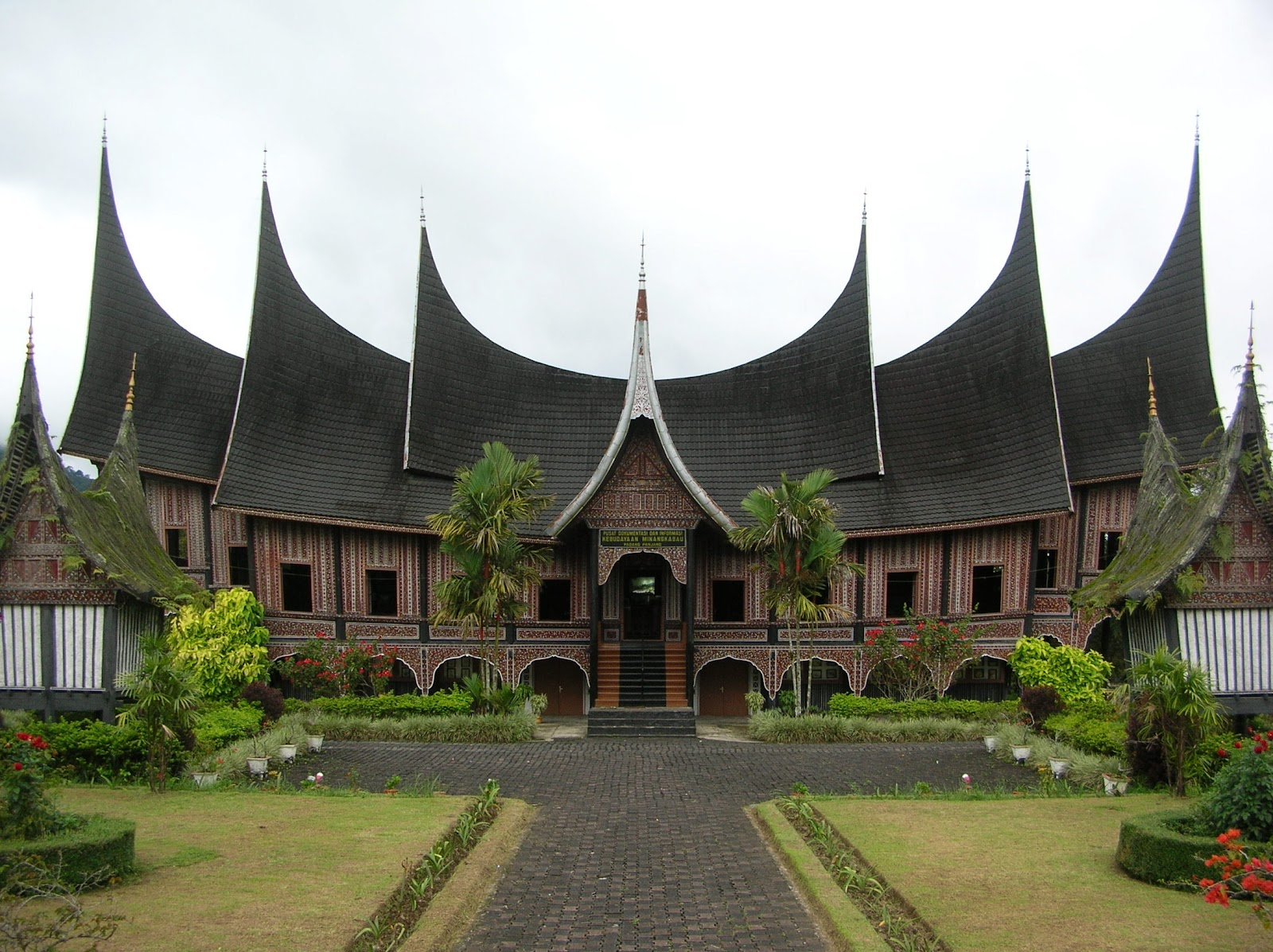
Rumah gadang, traditional house of Minangkabau.

The traditional house of the Minangkabau people, is called Rumah Gadang. The rumah Gadang is usually built on a plot of land belonging to the parent family in the tribe and people from generation to generation. Not far from the rumah gadang complex is usually also built a surau that functions as a place of worship and a place of residence for unmarried adult men. The rumah gadang is made in the form of a rectangle and is divided into two front and rear parts, generally made of wood, and at first glance it looks like a stilt house with a distinctive roof, prominent like a buffalo horn, the local people call it Gonjong and the roof was formerly made from palm fiber before changing to a zinc roof. This rumah Bagonjong according to the local community was inspired by the Tambo, which tells of the arrival of their ancestors by boat from the sea. Another distinctive feature of this traditional house is not using iron nails but using wooden pegs, but strong enough as a binder.

The houses have dramatic curved roof structures with multi-tiered, upswept gables. They are also well distinguished by their rooflines which curve upward from the middle and end in points, in imitation of the upward-curving horns of the water buffalo that supposedly eked the people their name (i.e. "victors of the buffalo"). Shuttered windows are built into walls incised with profuse painted floral carvings. The term rumah gadang usually refers to the larger communal homes, however, smaller single residences share many of its architectural elements.

==== Carving ====
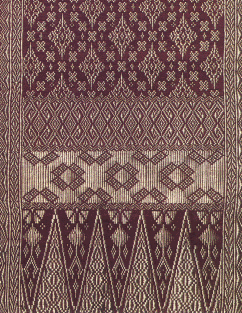
Minangkabau songket carving.

The Minangkabau people have long developed cultural arts in the form of carvings. The art of carving was previously owned by many villages (Nagari) in Minangkabau. However, at present the art of carving only develops in certain nagari, such as Pandai sikek. Cloth is a carving medium that is often used by the Minang community, songket is a fabric that belongs to the brocade textiles of the Miangkabaub people, it is hand-woven in silk or cotton, and intricately patterned with gold or silver threads. In addition, carvings are also widely used as decorations for the Rumah Gadang. Rumah Gadang carvings are usually in the form of circular or square lines, with motifs such as vines, leafy roots, flowering and fruiting. The root pattern is usually in the form of a circle, roots are aligned, coincide, intertwine and also join. Root branches or twigs curl outward, inward, upward and downward. Besides that, other motifs found in the carvings of the Rumah Gadang are geometric motifs with triangles, four and parallelograms. The types of carvings of the Rumah Gadang include kaluak paku, pucuak tabuang, saluak aka, jalo, jarek, itiak pulang patang, saik galamai, and sikambang manis.

==== Cuisine ====
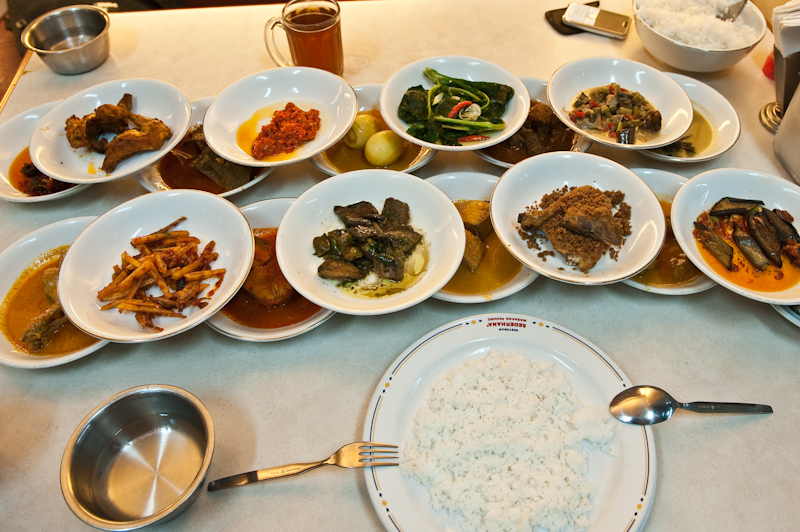
Minangkabau cuisine (Padang food) served at a restaurant in Bukittinggi.

Cooking delicious food is one of the culture and habits of the Minangkabau people. This is due to the frequent holding of traditional parties, which require serving delicious food. Minangkabau cuisine is not only served for the Minangkabau people, but has also been consumed by people throughout the archipelago. Minang people usually sell their specialties such as rendang, asam padeh, soto padang, sate padang, and dendeng balado at a restaurant known as Padang Restaurant. Padang restaurants are not only scattered throughout Indonesia, but are also widely available in Malaysia, Singapore, Australia, the Netherlands, and the United States. Rendang, one of the Minangkabau specialties, has been named the most delicious food in the world.

Padang food is famous for its use of coconut milk and spicy chili. Minang cuisine consists of three main elements: gulai (curry), lado (chili pepper) and bareh (rice). Among the cooking traditions in Indonesian cuisine, Minangkabau cuisine and most of Sumatran cuisine demonstrate Indian and Middle Eastern influences, with dishes cooked in curry sauce with coconut milk and the heavy use of spice mixtures.

Minangkabau cuisine is a dish that is rich in various spices. Therefore, many are cooked using spices such as chili, lemongrass, galangal, turmeric, ginger, garlic, and shallots. Coconut is one of the elements forming the taste of Minang cuisine. The main ingredients of Minang cuisine include beef, mutton, chicken, fish and eel. Minangkabau people only serve halal food, so they avoid alcohol and lard. In addition, Minangkabau cuisine also does not use chemical ingredients for coloring, preservatives, and flavorings. The cooking technique is rather complicated and takes a long time, making it a delicious and durable food.

In 2011, an online poll of 35,000 people by CNN International nominated Minangkabau beef of rendang as the No. 1 World's most delicious dish in their World's 50 most delicious foods: Readers' picks list (even though it was #11 on the original list produced by the staff). In 2018, rendang was officially recognised as being one of the 5 national dishes of Indonesia.

==== Music ====
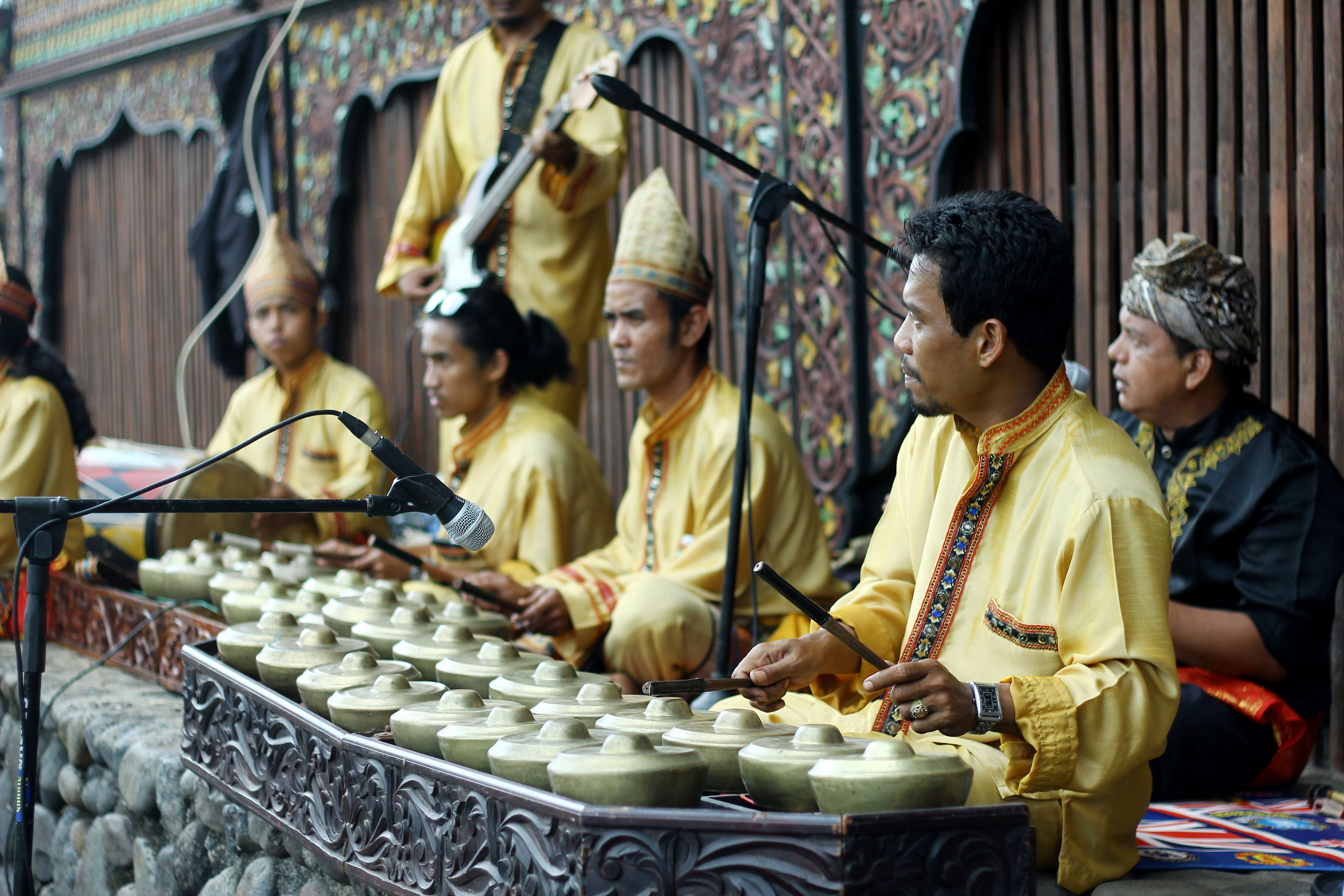
Talempong instrumental music.

Minangkabau culture creates many types of musical instruments and traditional songs in Indonesia. Among the Minangkabau musical instruments are the saluang, talempong, rebab, and bansi. These four musical instruments are usually played at traditional and wedding parties. Now, Minang music is not limited to being played using these four musical instruments. But also using modern musical instruments such as organ, piano, guitar and drums. Many contemporary Minang songs also follow modern musical genres such as pop, hip-hop and remixes.

Since the era of Indonesian independence, Minang songs have not only been sung in West Sumatra, but have also been sung in many overseas countries. There is even a Minangkabau Song Festival that is held in Jakarta. The 1960s was the heyday of the Minang song. It is proven by the frequency of Minang songs being played on radio channels RRI Jakarta and others.

The liveliness of the Minang music industry in the second half of the 20th century was caused by the large number of music studios owned by Minang entrepreneurs. In addition, the large demand for Minang songs by overseas communities is a factor in the success of the Minang music industry.

==== Dance ====
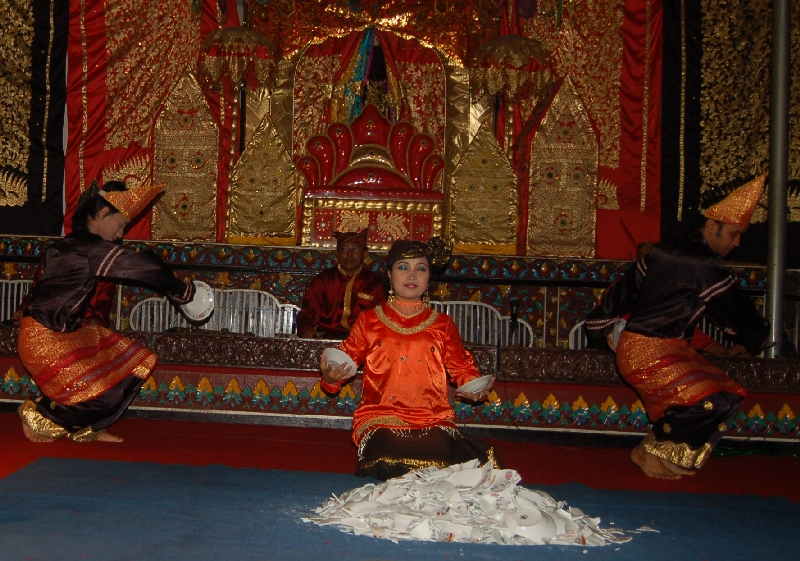
Tari piring performance.

The peculiarities of Minangkabau dance are generally influenced by the Islamic religion, the uniqueness of matrilineal customs and the habit of migrating their communities also give a great influence on the soul of a classical dance that is classic, characteristics of the Minangkabau dance are fast, loud, stomping, and dynamic, including tari pasambahan, tari piring, tari payung, and the tari indang. Meanwhile, there is also a performance typical of other Minangkabau ethnic groups in the form of a unique blend of martial arts called silek with dancing, singing and acting known as Randai.

==== Martial art ====
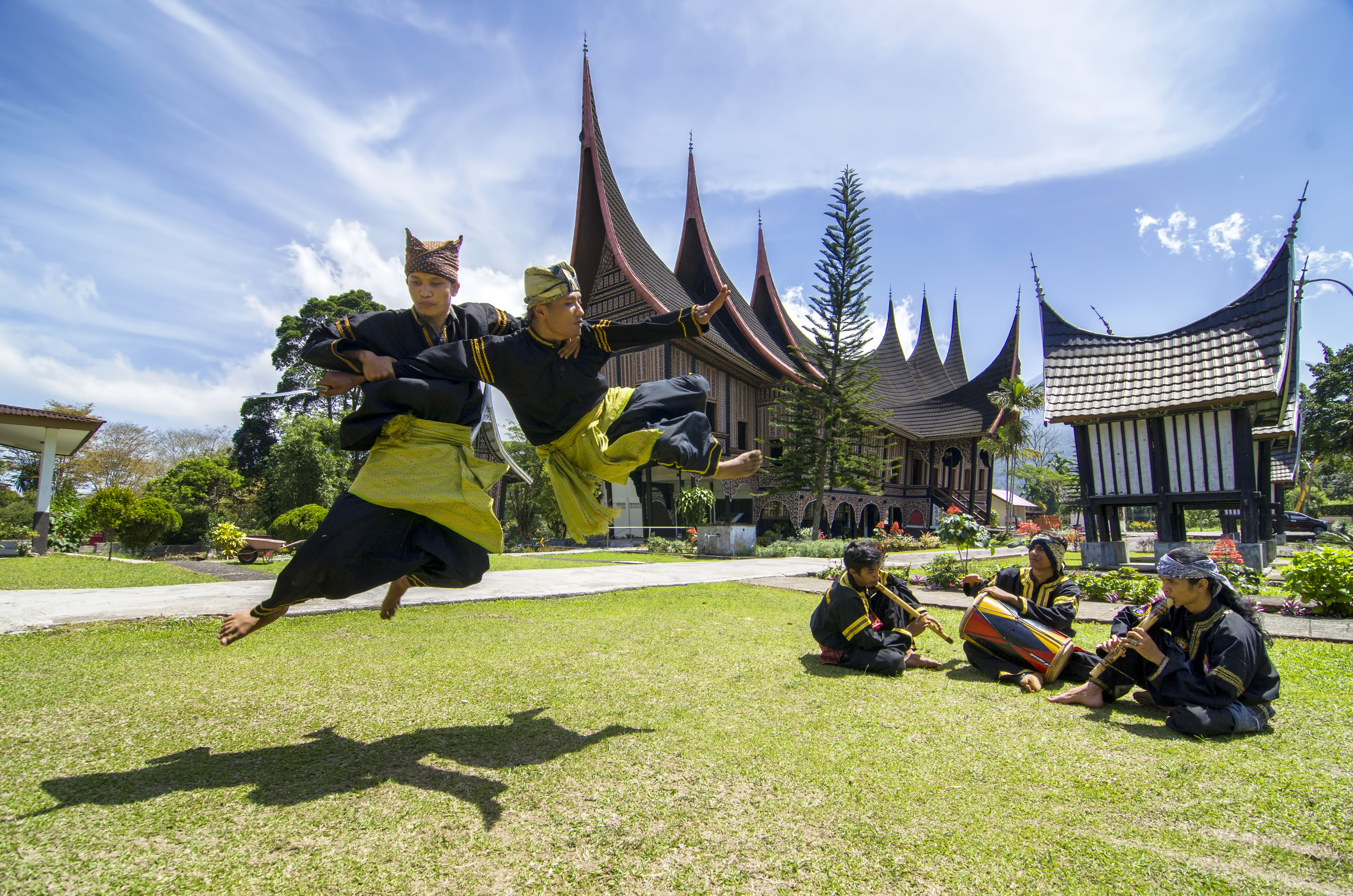
Silek or Silat Minangkabau is a traditional martial art of cultural heritage of our forefathers of the nation of Indonesia.

Silek or Silat Minangkabau is a martial art owned by the people of Minangkabau, West Sumatra, Indonesia. The Minangkabau people have had the character of like to wander since hundreds of years ago. To wander, of course they must have sufficient provisions to guard themselves from the worst things while traveling or overseas, for example being attacked or robbed by people. Apart from being a provision for wandering, silek is important for village defense against threats from outside. Minangkabau Silat can also be used as a means of entertainment combined with a drama called Randai. Which contains advice and advice from our ancestors passed down from generation to generation.

The nature of immigrants from the Minangkabau community has made the Minangkabau silek (Silat) now spread all over the world. In the past, these migrants had sufficient martial arts supplies and wherever they went they also often opened targets for silat (silat school) in the overseas areas and taught the local population their own martial arts. They usually melt with the surrounding population because there is a kind of saying in Minangkabau that requires them to mingle with the community in which they live. The sound of the proverb is "dima bumi dipijak di situ langik dijunjuang, dima rantiang dipatah di situ aia disauak". This proverb requires Minang nomads to respect local culture and opens up opportunities for Minangkabau silat overseas to experience modification due to the influence of local martial arts and a new genre or genre that can be said is unique to the area. Silek Minangkabau also spread because it was taught to newcomers who used to live in Minang realm.

==== Literature ====
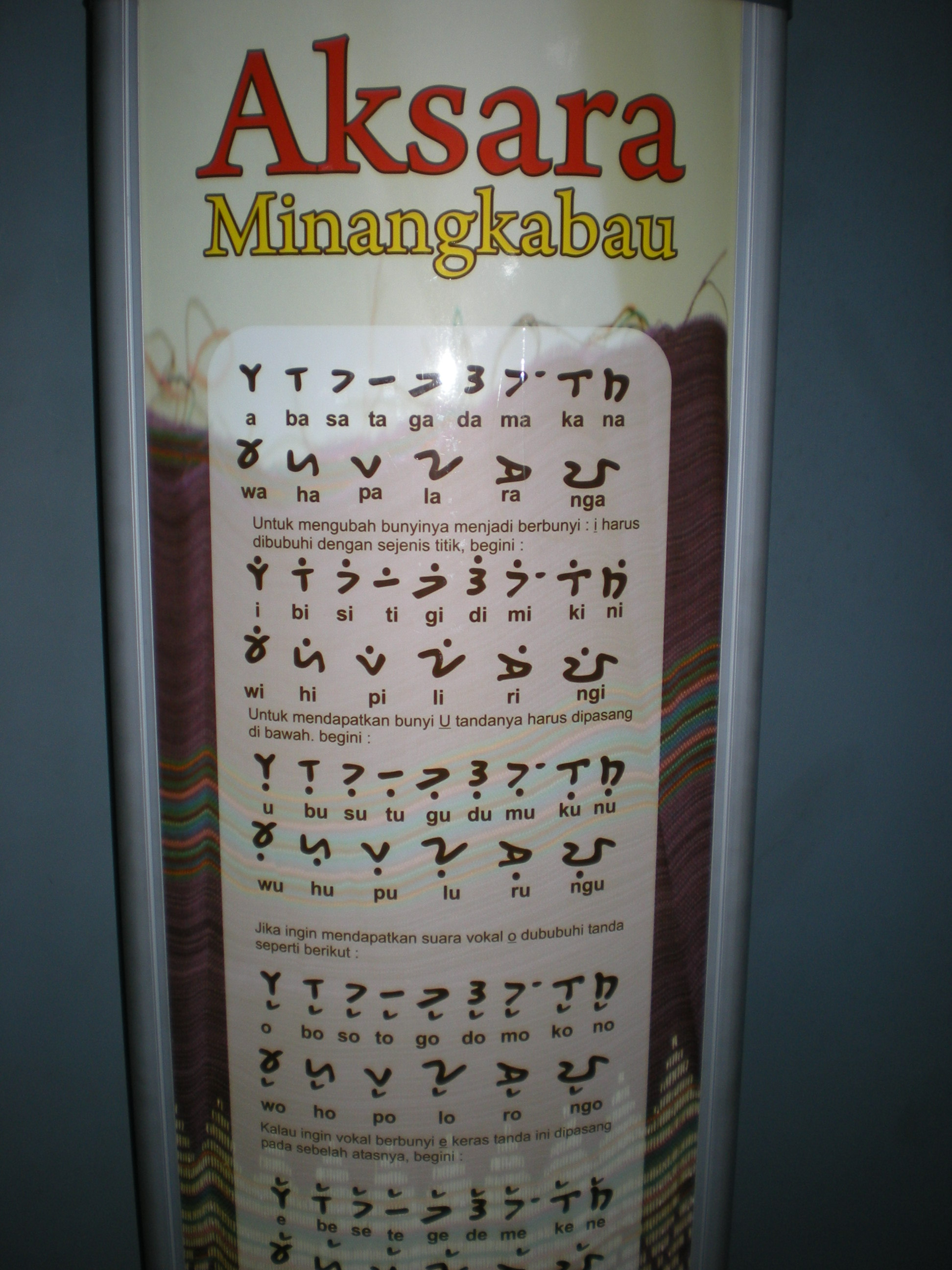
Minangkabau script.

The Minangkabau people have had a literacy culture since the 12th century. This is indicated by the discovery of the Minangkabau script. The Tanjung Tanah Law Book is one of the first literatures of the Minangkabau community. Tambo Minangkabau written in Malay, is Minangkabau literature in the form of traditional historiography. In medieval times, many Minangkabau literature was written using the Jawi script.

At this time, many Minangkabau literature was in the form of humorous tales and advice. Minangkabau traditional folktales (kaba) consist of narratives that present the social and personal consequences of either ignoring or observing the ethical teachings and the norms embedded in the adat. The storyteller (tukang kaba) recites the story in poetic or lyrical prose while accompanying himself on a rebab. In addition, there are also religious books written by tarekat scholars. At the end of the 19th century, traditional stories that came from mouth to mouth, such as Cindua Mato, Anggun Nan Tongga, Malin Kundang, and Sabai Nan Aluih began to be recorded.

In the 20th century, Minangkabau writers were the main figures in the formation of Indonesian language and literature. Through their works of novels, romances and poetry, Indonesian literature began to grow and develop. So that novels that are widely circulated and become important teaching materials for students throughout Indonesia and Malaysia, are novels with Minangkabau cultural backgrounds. Such as Tenggelamnya Kapal van der Wijck, Merantau ke Deli and Di Bawah Lindungan Ka'bah by Hamka, Salah Asuhan by Abdul Muis, Sitti Nurbaya by Marah Roesli, and Robohnya Surau Kami by Ali Akbar Navis. The Minangkabau literacy culture also gave birth to poet figures such as Chairil Anwar, Taufiq Ismail, Afrizal Malna and other literary figures, Sutan Takdir Alisjahbana.

=== Ceremonies and festivals ===
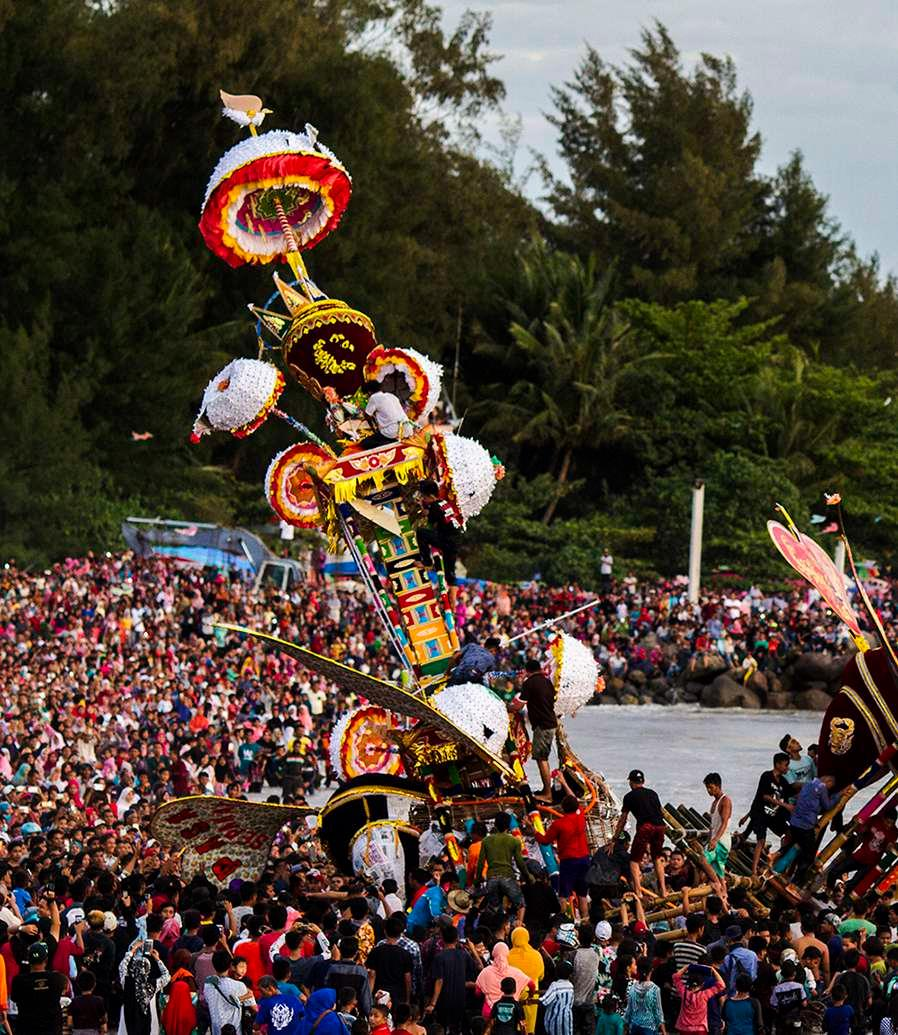
Tabuik ceremony

Minangkabau ceremonies and festivals include:

- Turun mandi – baby blessing ceremony
- Sunat rasul – circumcision ceremony
- Baralek – wedding ceremony
- Batagak pangulu – clan leader inauguration ceremony. Other clan leaders, all relatives in the same clan and all villagers in the region are invited. The ceremony lasts for seven days or more.
- Turun ka sawah – community work ceremony
- Manyabik – harvesting ceremony
- Hari Rayo – the local observance of Eid al-Fitr
- Adoption ceremony
- Adat ceremony
- Funeral ceremony
- Wild boar hunt ceremony
- Maanta pabukoan – sending food to mother-in-law for Ramadan
- Tabuik – local Mourning of Muharram in the coastal village of Pariaman
- Tanah Ta Sirah, inaugurate a new datuk when the old one died in the few hours (no need to proceed to the batagak pangulu, but the clan must invite all datuk in the region.
- Mambangkik Batang Tarandam, inaugurate a new datuk when the old one died in the past 10 or 50 years and even more, attendance in the Batagak Pangulu ceremony is mandatory.

== See also ==
- Culture of Indonesia
- Minangkabau people
- West Sumatra
