= Indang dance =

Indonesian traditional dance

Indang
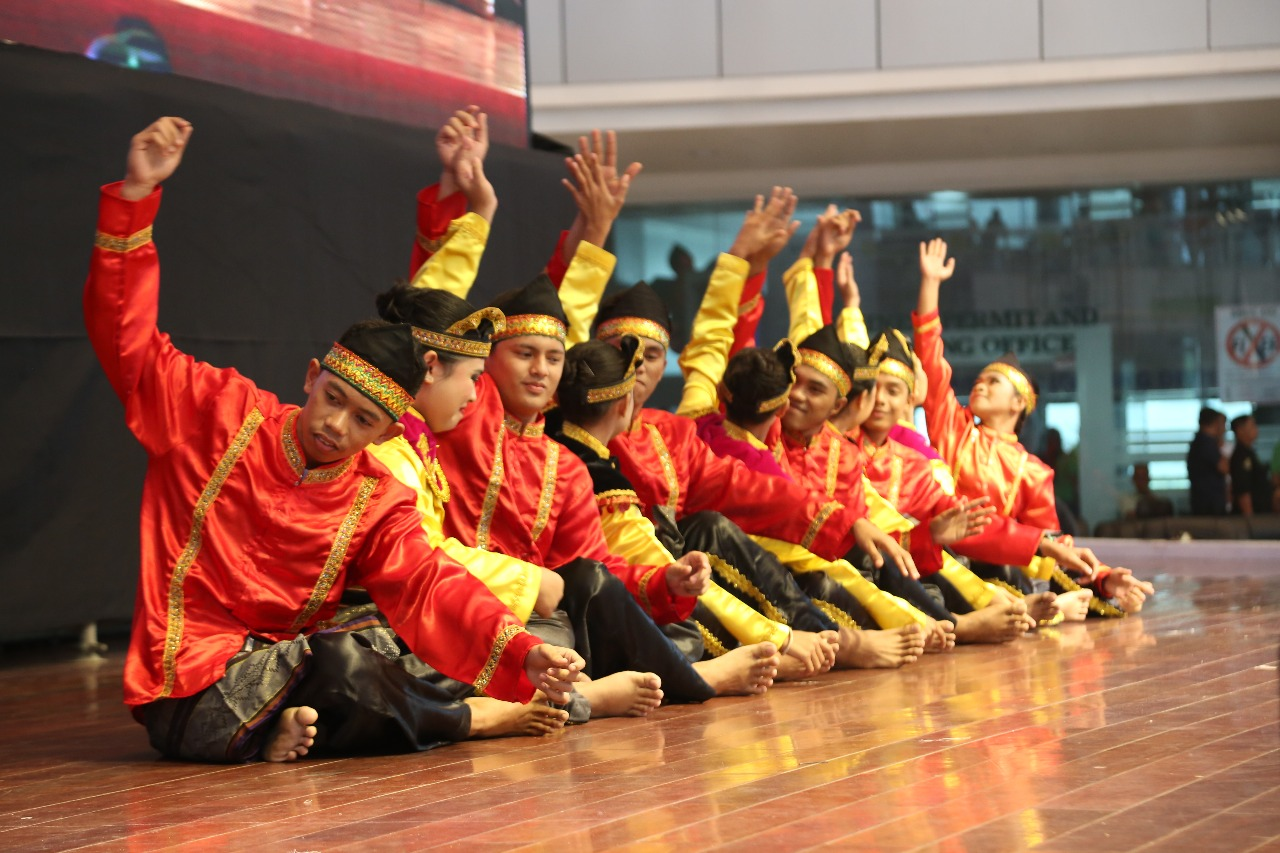
- Indang dance performance
- Native name: Tari Indang or Dindin badindin
- Origin: Western Sumatra (Indonesia)

Indang or Endang, also called Dindin badindin, is a traditional Minangkabau Islamic dance originating from West Sumatra, Indonesia. Indang dance grows and develops in the Minangkabau community as a portrayal of the arrival of Islam in West Sumatra in the 13th century.

historically this dance was the result of acculturation of Minang culture and Islamic culture which spread in the 14th century. It is said that Islamic civilization was introduced by Islamic traders who entered Aceh. Starting from the west coast of Sumatra island to then spread to Ulakan-Pariaman.

This art continues to develop in the usual surau that are played after the Quran activity. Because of the nature of religious education, the contents of the songs available contain religious teachings.

As for further developments, this art changed from surau out to surau to a place called matches. A place without walls that allows viewers to see from all directions.

In the past, every nagari in Pariaman had its own Indang arts group, and Indang was once full of something sacred. Some say that each of these groups has a "sipatuang sirah" i.e. parents who have supernatural powers to maintain the safety of their group from outside forces that can destroy other groups.

In addition, in terms of timing, the term Indang is known to rise and Indang goes down. When entering the first day, the Indang game will start at midnight between 11 and 12 pm. Meanwhile, if the game enters the second day, it starts when it is already dusk or after the Maghrib prayer. Indang dances are also popular outside Indonesia such as Negeri Sembilan, Malaysia.

== History ==
Some say that Indang is a traditional dance created by Rapa’i. Rapa'i itself is a term for loyal followers of Sheikh Burhanuddin, a prominent figure as a pioneer of the Tabuik Tradition in Pariaman or also the Tabot Tradition in Bengkulu. Therefore, Indang Dance is almost always staged every time the celebration is held.

Along with its development, Indang Dance has become an enduring art, especially in the area of Padang Pariaman District which is popular with the game Indang Pariaman or Indang Piaman. One of the characteristics of Indang is that it is always played at night in nagari events such as the batagak kudo-kudo and other cultural festivals.

== See also ==
- Candle dance
- Pasambahan
- Tari piring
- Randai
- Minangkabau
- Dance of Indonesia
