= Payung dance =

Indonesian traditional dance

Payung
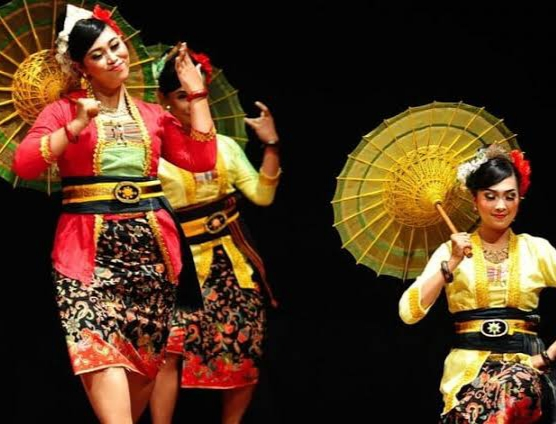
- This dance symbolizes the appreciation of love, which consists of an even number of dancers. This dance is performed by playing an umbrella as the main instrument
- Native name: Payuang (Minangkabau); Tari Payung (Indonesian)
- Instrument: Talempong
- Inventor: Minangkabau people
- Origin: Indonesia

Payung dance (Minangkabau: tari Payuang; Jawi: تاري ڤايوڠ) is a folk dance-drama tradition of the Minangkabau-Malay ethnic group in Sumatra, Indonesia. This dance is a Minangkabau version of other Malay dances from Sumatra. Folk theatre such as toneel and sandiwara often incorporates payung dance as part of the show. The payung (umbrella) is the main prop used in this dance, and the dance itself, which is usually performed by three or four dancers, symbolizes affection and the relationship of young people. The dance originates from Western Sumatra, Indonesia.

Payung dance is performed as a part of toneel, sandiwara, exhibition, opening of a party, or a wedding occasion of Minangkabau people.

== Etymology ==
In the Indonesian language, payung (Indonesian) or payuang (Minangkabau) means "umbrella" or "parasol". The dance-drama is called payung dance because it uses the umbrella as the main prop to represent security and protection in a marital relationship.

== Philosophy ==
Payung dance uses payung (umbrella) and selendang (shawl) as props. The payung is used by men, and the selendang is used by women in the dance. The payung symbolizes protection, which for men is generally considered the main function in the family. The male dancer protects the female dancer's head. The selendang used by female dancers symbolizes the sacred bond of love between a couple. The shawl also symbolizes a woman's loyalty and readiness to foster a household with a husband. This idea is performed when the selendang of the female dancer is placed on the male dancer.

== Similar dances ==
Payung dance is also performed by Peranakan communities of Malaysia. Payung dance originated in China and was brought to Malaysia by Chinese diaspora living in the country. This dance evolved with local elements to form a popular type of Peranakan dance.

== See also ==
- Dance in Indonesia
- Lilin dance
- Pasambahan dance
- Piring dance
- Randai
