= Anti-twister =

Anti-twister can mean:

- Anticyclonic tornado, a type of tornado
- Anti-twister mechanism, a mechanism that allows continuous rotation of an object attached by a link
