= Tabuik =

Remembrance of Muharram

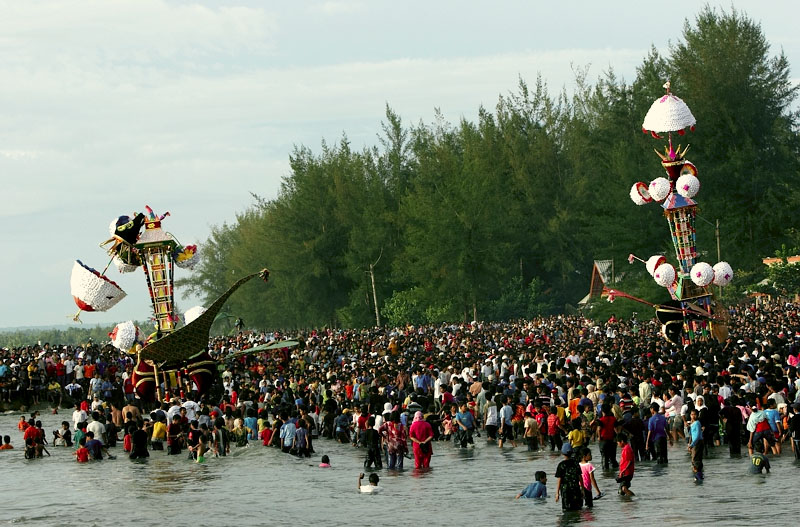
- Tabuik being lowered into the sea in Pariaman.
- Status: Active
- Frequency: Every year
- Country: Indonesia

A Tabuik is the local manifestation of the Mourning of Muharram, in particular Ashura in Twelver Shi'a Islam, among the Minangkabau people in the coastal regions of West Sumatra, Indonesia, particularly in the city of Pariaman. The ceremony is also observed by the Bengkulu Malays in Bengkulu, where it is known as Tabot and has become a significant cultural tradition in the region.

== History ==
A Tabuik also refers to the towering funeral bier carried around during the remembrance procession. It is similar in form to totem poles in the Northwest Coast art of indigenous peoples of North America.

Since 1831, the practice of throwing a tabuik into the sea has taken place every year in Pariaman on Ashura, which is the 10th of Muharram. The practice was introduced to the region by the Twelver Shia sepoy troops from India who were stationed — and later settled — there during the British Raj.

== The events ==
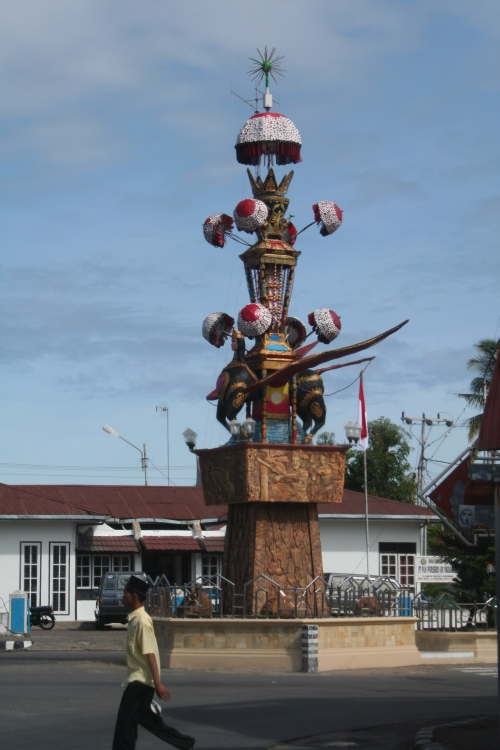
A tabuik monument in the center of Pariaman, Indonesia.

The festival includes reenactments of the Battle of Karbala and the playing of tassa and dhol drums. Although initially a Twelver festival, nowadays, most Pariaman inhabitants and other Southeastern Asians hold similar festivals, which are even celebrated by non-Muslims.

== The remembrance bier ==
The remembrance is referred to as Tabut or Tabot in Indonesian. Tabut is the name given in the Quran for the Ark of the Covenant. One or more tabuiks made from bamboo, rattan, and paper are usually prepared for the ceremony. Activities held during the week of Tabuik include kite races, traditional plays, and dance expositions such as the Tari Piring. The memorial draws a large crowd, including dignitaries like the provincial governor. Visitors and celebrants can observe the tabuik in the morning before it is slowly taken to the beach in a procession. At noon, the tabuik is thrown into the sea. Afterwards, many people go swimming to make 'memories' of the tabuik to cherish.

== Gallery ==
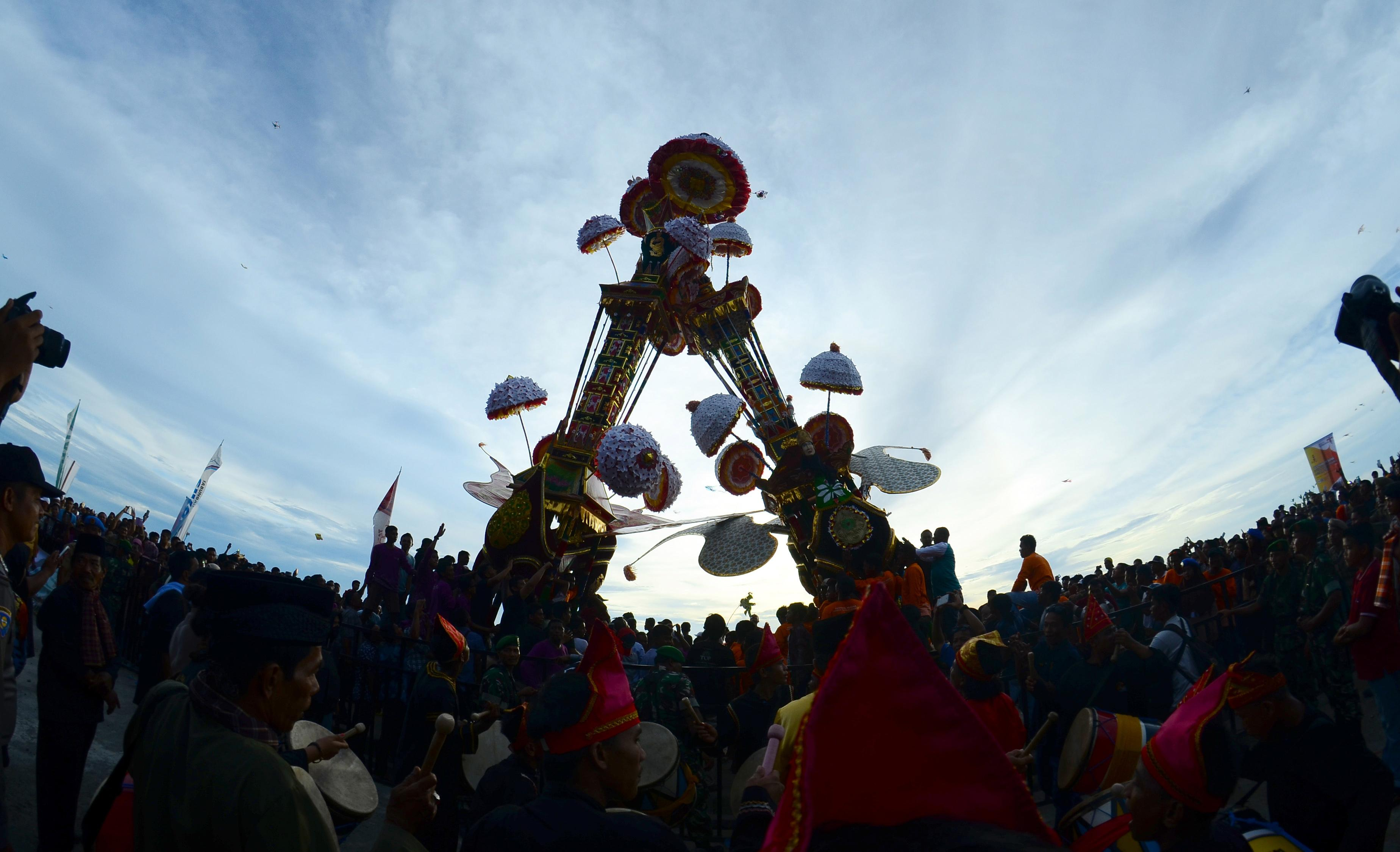
2018

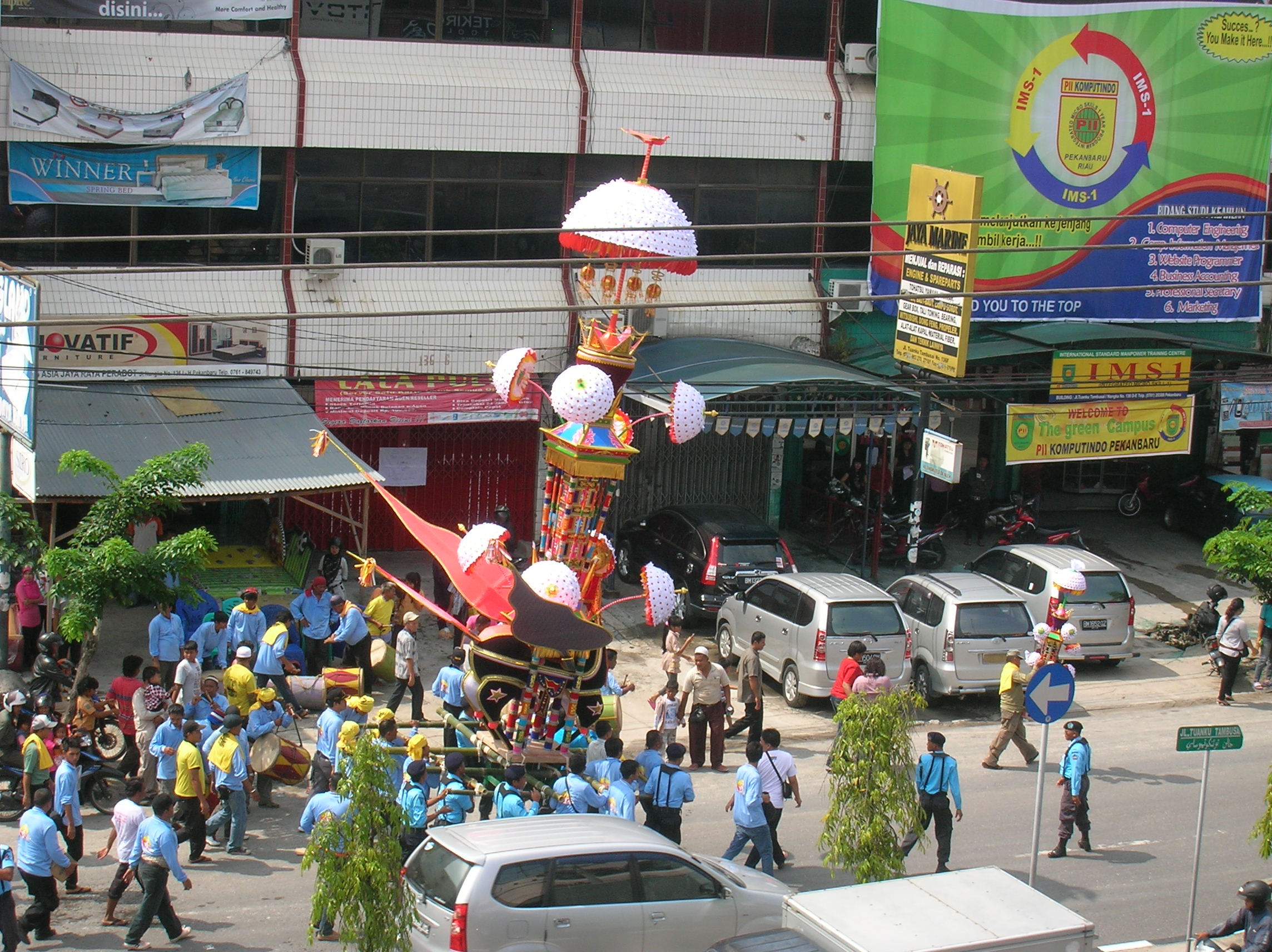

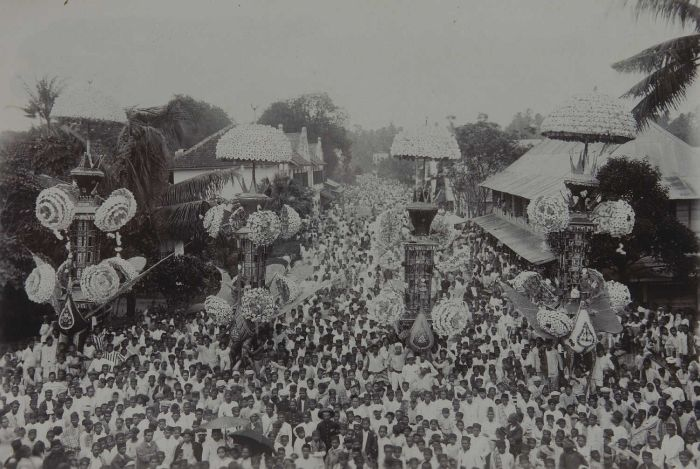
1915 or 1935

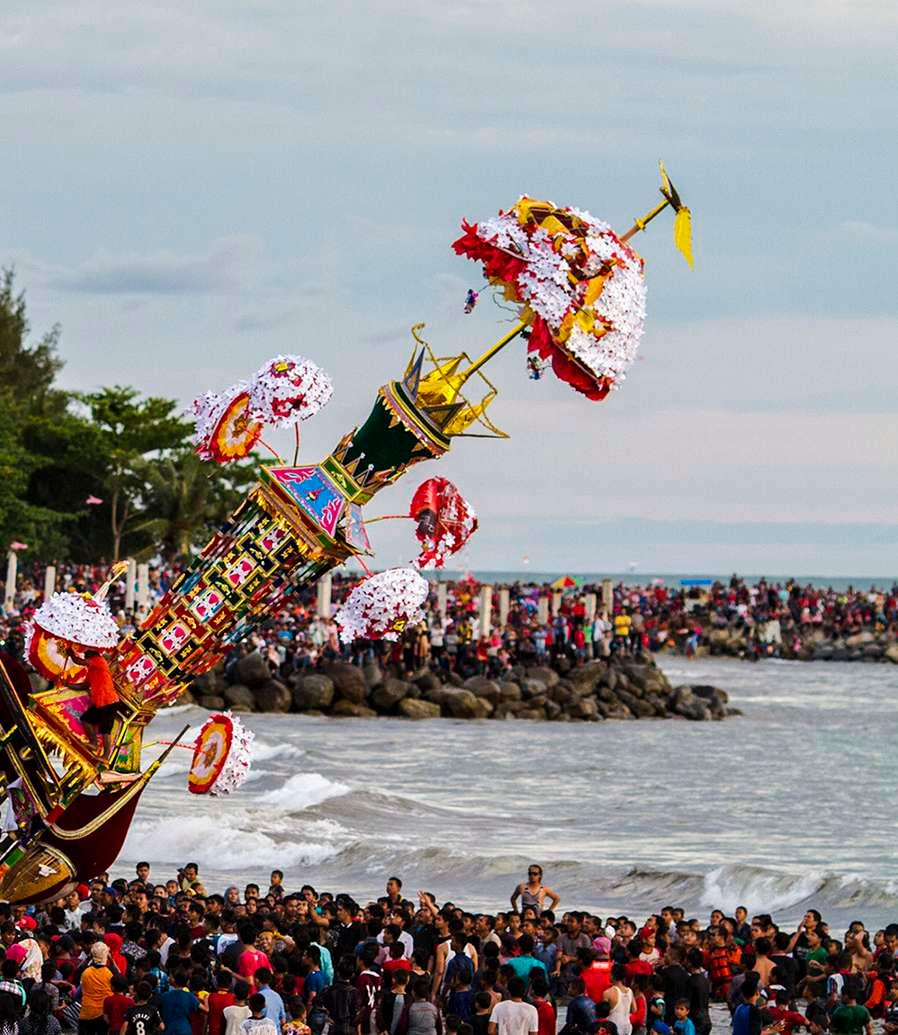

== See also ==
- Minangkabau culture
- Culture of Indonesia
- Islam in Indonesia
- Shi'a Islam in Indonesia
- Hosay
