= Shia Islam in Indonesia =

Shi'a Islam in Indonesia represents a small minority in the largely-Sunni Muslim country. Around one million Indonesians are Shias, who are concentrated around Jakarta. Indonesian Shia are found in areas of Java, Madura and Sumatra.

== History ==
Certain Shia practices or beliefs may have influenced some historical Indonesian literature and customs. Shia Muslim merchants may also have visited and resided in precolonial Indonesia. Small groups of Shia Arabs lived in Indonesia since the 19th century. However, Shiism as an organized religion or native conversions to Shia Islam didn't begin in Indonesia until the 1970s, especially after the Iranian Revolution.

== Communities ==
Among the Indonesian communities which practise Shiism are minority segments of the Hadrami, Arab-descended Indonesians, who have a "small, but increasing, minority of Shia followers". Another group are the Shia of Pariaman and Bengkulu in Sumatra, and Sigli in Aceh, who claim descent from Indian sepoys, and are known as Sipahi people (orang Sipahi) or Kling people (orang Keling). The Sipahi people traditionally practise the Shia tabut ritual, though in Aceh it has been banned since 1953.

== Persecution ==
The 2010 report to the United States Congress by the United States Commission on International Religious Freedom noted attacks against the Shia communities in Indonesia, particularly in East Java and Madura in 2008. In one incident in Madura, local villagers surrounded Shia houses and demanded they desist religious activities, but the crowd was dispersed by local leaders and clergy.

== See also ==
- Tabuik, a Minang observance of Ashura
- Shia Islam in Malaysia
- Islam in Australia
