= Lilin dance =

Indonesian (Minangkabau) traditional dance

Lilin dance Candle dance
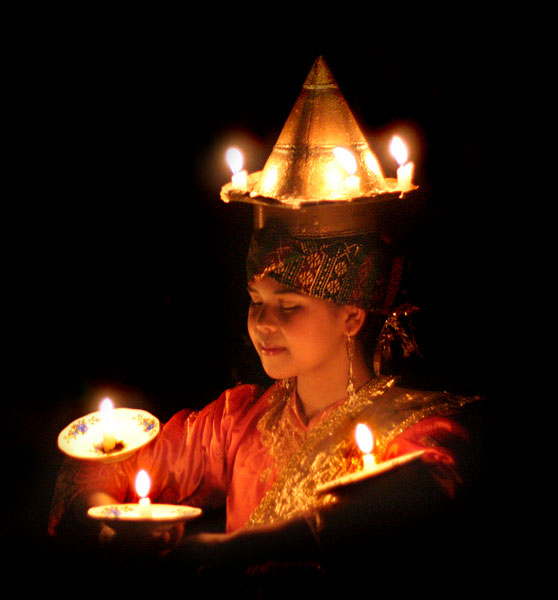
- Lilin dancers in Padang, Western Sumatra, Indonesia
- Native name: tari lilin
- Instrument(s): Talempong, Saluang, Kendhang
- Inventor: Minangkabau
- Origin: Western Sumatra (Indonesia)

The Lilin dance (from Minangkabau lilin 'candle') is a traditional Indonesian (Minangkabau) dance performed by a group of dancers to the accompaniment of a group of musicians. The dancers carry lit candles on plates held on the palm of each hand. The dancers dance in groups, rotating the plates at a horizontal plane.

== History ==
The dance is said to have been created by the Minang people of West Sumatra, Indonesia in the time of kingdoms in Indonesia.

== Origin ==
According to traditional Indonesian folklore, there was once a girl whose fiancé had left to go trading. One day, the girl lost her engagement ring somewhere near her home. She searched for it across her yard by using a candle placed on a plate. In her search, the girl bent to the ground, rushing across the yard. Her twisting and turning to balance the candle appeared to be beautiful dance moves. It was from here that the Candle Dance originated and began to spread across Indonesia.

== Occasions ==
Traditionally, the Candle Dance strictly happened during festivals around the Harvest Season: honoring the god of their community, to convey gratitude to God for the prosperity of the community, and to pray for a bountiful harvest. In recent times, however, It has begun to be used in entertainment and art. In weddings, it is part of interlude performances, usually after the pasambahan. The dance has also been done to enliven cultural events and public performances.

== Performance ==
The Candle Dance is usually performed by a group of female dancers, but sometimes men and women perform it in pairs. Dancers balance small plates holding burning candles in the palms of their hands. The dance is usually accompanied by Minang music played on traditional instruments like the Talempong, the Saluang, and the Kendang.

== See also ==
- Plate trick
- Pandanggo
- Anti-twister mechanism
- Tari Piring
- Pasambahan
