= Anti-twister mechanism =

Special way of connecting two objects through flexible links

The anti-twister or antitwister mechanism is a method of connecting a flexible link between two objects, one of which is rotating with respect to the other, in a way that prevents the link from becoming twisted. The link could be an electrical cable or a flexible conduit.

This mechanism is intended as an alternative to the usual method of supplying electric power to a rotating device, through the use of slip rings. The slip rings are attached to one part of the machine, and a set of fine metal brushes are attached to the other part. The brushes are kept in sliding contact with the slip rings, providing an electrical path between the two parts while allowing the parts to rotate about each other.

However, this presents problems with smaller devices. Whereas with large devices minor fluctuations in the power provided through the brush mechanism are inconsequential, in the case of tiny electronic components, the brushing introduces unacceptable levels of noise in the stream of power supplied. Therefore, a smoother means of power delivery is needed.

A device designed and patented in 1971 by Dale A. Adams and reported in The Amateur Scientist in December 1975, solves this problem with a rotating disk above a base from which a cable extends up, over, and onto the top of the disk. As the disk rotates the plane of this cable is rotated at exactly half the rate of the disk so the cable experiences no net twisting.

What makes the device possible is the peculiar connectivity of the space of 3D rotations, as discovered by P. A. M. Dirac and illustrated in his Plate trick (also known as the string trick or belt trick). Its covering Spin(3) group can be represented by unit quaternions, also known as versors.

Illustration of the principle of the anti-twister mechanism.

== See also ==
- Quaternions and spatial rotation
- Candle dance
