= Pasambahan dance =

Indonesian traditional dance

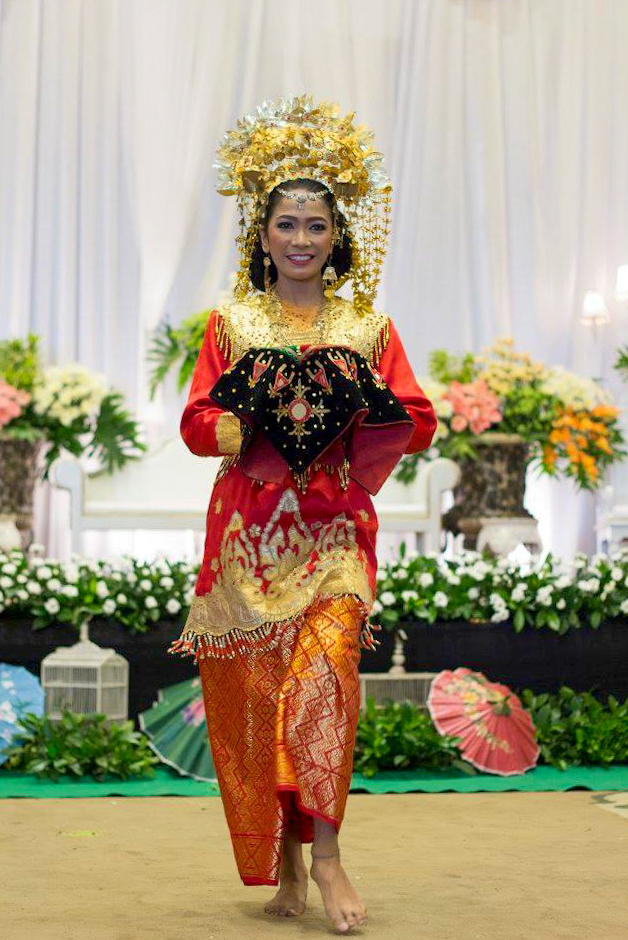
- Genre: Traditional
- Origin: Western Sumatra (Indonesia)

Pasambahan is a Minangkabau traditional dance that has developed in various regions in the province of West Sumatra, Indonesia. Pasambahan dance is usually performed as a ceremonial welcoming dance to honor the guests and elders to a traditional ceremony. However, in nowadays, this dance is performed not only in ceremonial welcoming events, but also as performance at public.

Pasambahan dance is performed in some cases—that are when the guests come from afar or when the groom arrives at the bride's house.

== Gallery ==
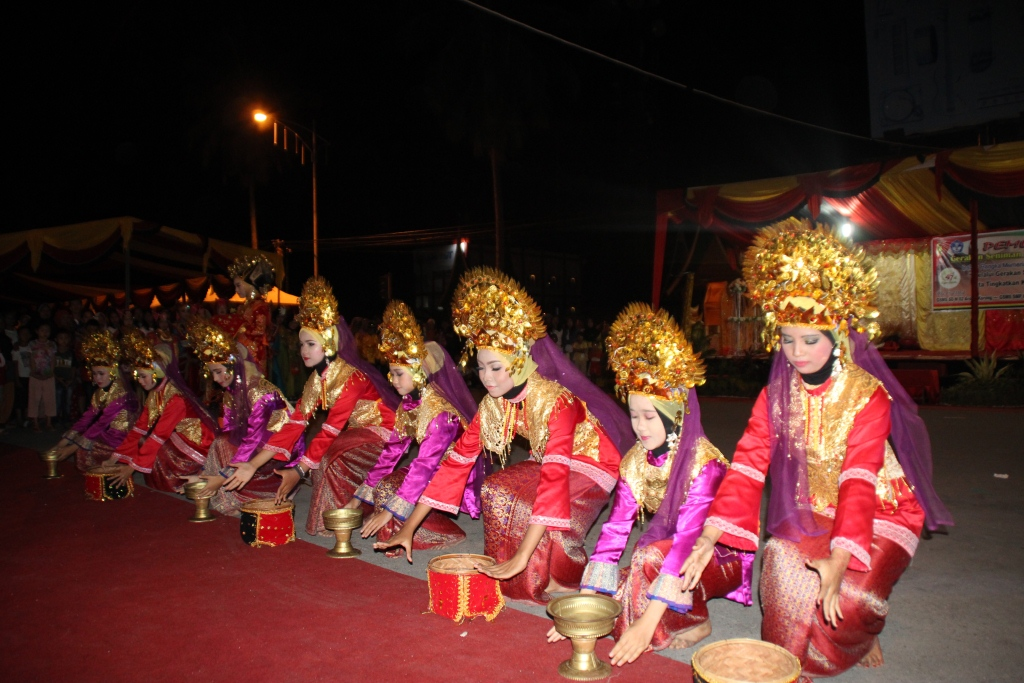

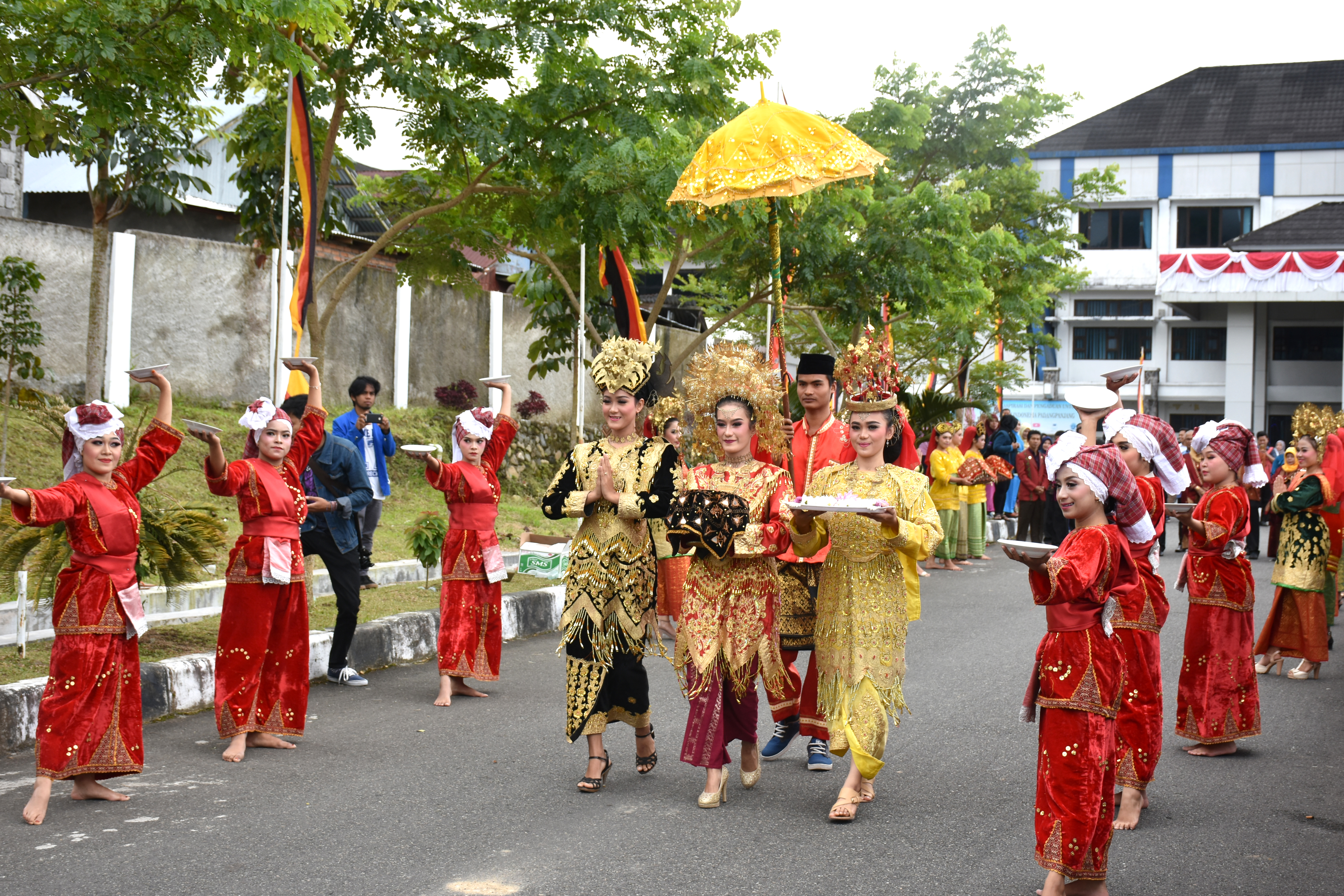

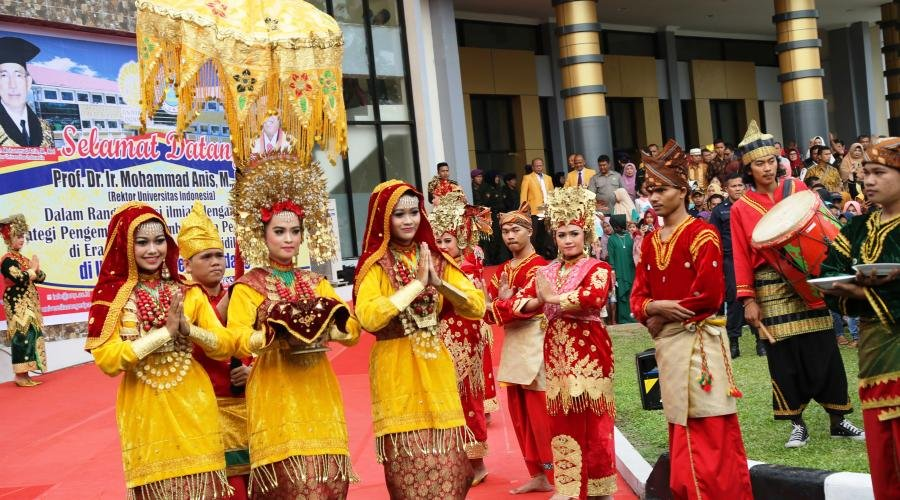

== See also ==
- Dance in Indonesia
- Indang
- Lilin
- Piring
- Zapin
