= Piring dance =

Indonesian traditional dance

- Tari piring performance
- Native name: Piriang (Minangkabau); Tari Piring (Indonesian)
- Genre: Traditional dance
- Instrument(s): Talempong, Saluang, Kendhang
- Inventor: Minangkabau people
- Origin: Western Sumatra (Indonesia)

Piring dance (Minangkabau: Piriang; Jawi: تاري ڤيريڠ) is a traditional Minangkabau plate dance originated and performed in West Sumatra, Indonesia. The dance might be performed by a group of women, men, or couples; each of whom holds a plate in each hand, and vigorously rotates or half rotates them in various formations and fast movements.

The dance demonstrates the skill of the dancers that manage balance and move the ceramics plate swiftly without dropping or breaking them. Another variation, called tari lilin (candle dance), sometimes involves candles that are lit on the plate. Dancers hold the bottom of plates in the palm of their hands and swing them wildly using the inertia to prevent the plate from falling. Dancers tap their plates with a ring on one of their fingers to animate their movement with sonic accompaniment.

This dance is usually performed as a ceremonial welcoming dance to honor the guests and elders to a traditional ceremony. Next to randai, saman, pendet and jaipongan, the dance is also one of popular Indonesian traditional dances performed in festivals abroad to promote Indonesian culture and tourism.

== History ==
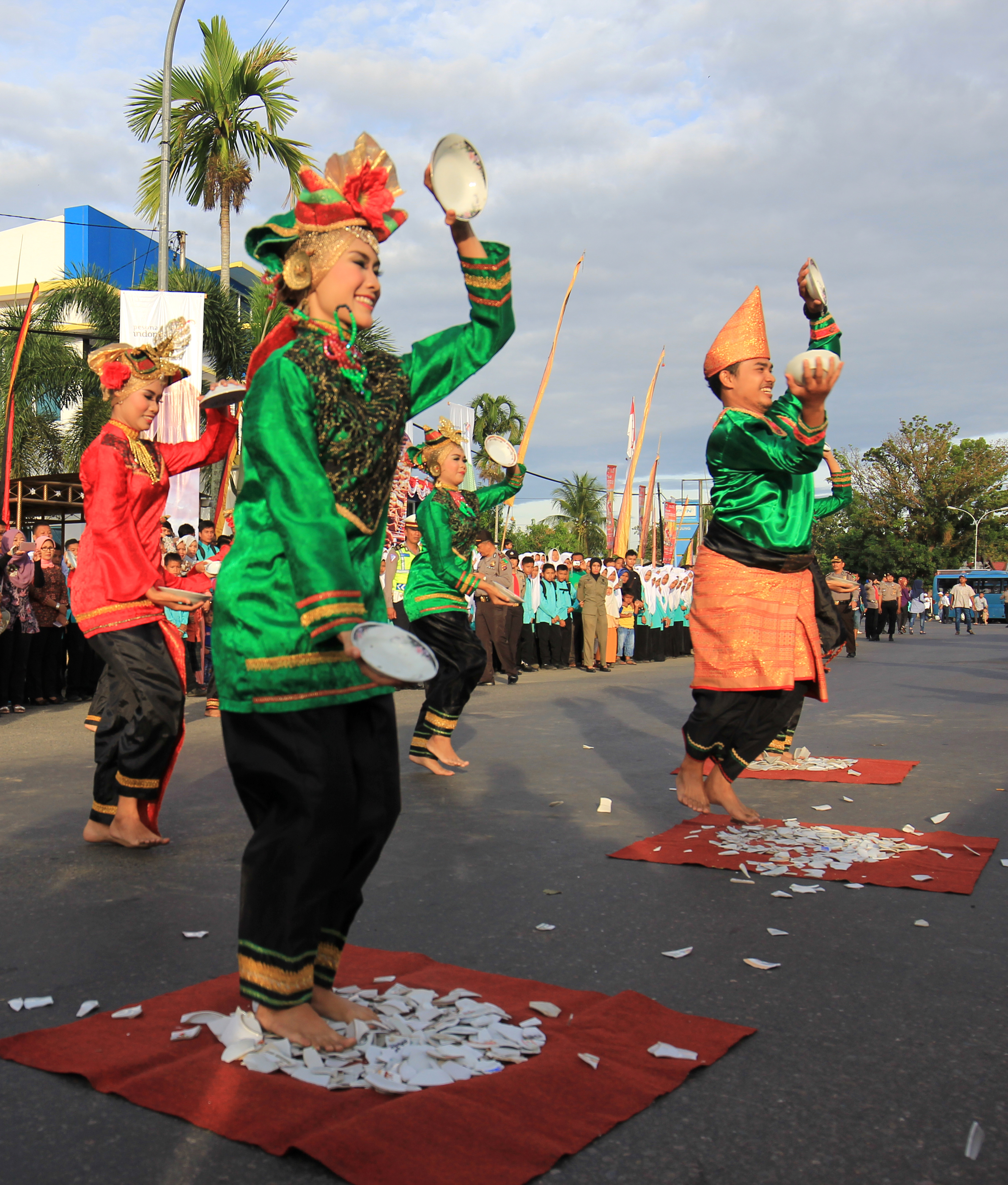
Piring dance performance by stepping on broken plates

Traditionally, this dance comes from Solok, West Sumatra. According to the legend of its early appearance, this Piring dance functions as a dance in fertility ceremonies. This dance is also a form of traditional art that has a lot of high aesthetic values and contains very deep ancestral cultural values. This dance is also a ritual of gratitude for the local community to the gods after getting an abundant harvest. The ritual is carried out by bringing sesajen (offering) in the form of food placed on a plate while walking with dynamic movements.

After the entry of Islam to Minangkabau, the piring dance is no longer used as a ritual of thanksgiving to the gods. However, the dance is used as a means of entertainment for many people who are displayed at public events.

== Form and movement ==
The Piring dance movement in general is to place two plates on the palm of the hand. The dancer swings the plate in rapid movements, interspersed with the clinking of a plate or two rings on the dancer's finger against the plate he is carrying. At the end of the dance, usually the dancers will throw to the floor and the dancers will dance on broken plates. The number of plate dance dancers is usually served odd consisting of three to seven people.

The dancers wear brightly colored clothes with shades of red and yellow and headgear.

This dance is accompanied by a combination of talempong and saluang musical instruments. The tempo of the music at first and regular, then gradually changed to become faster.

== Gallery ==
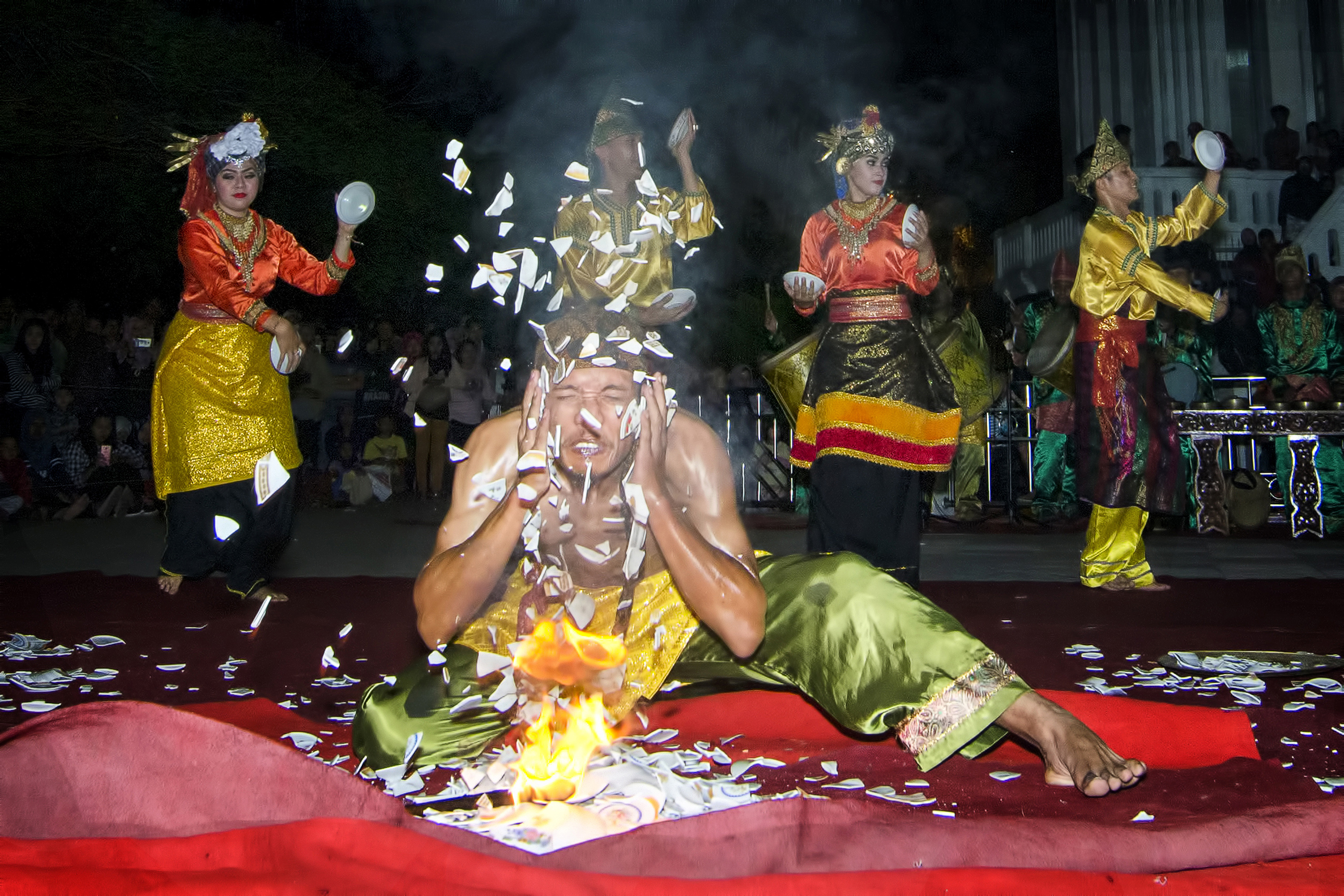

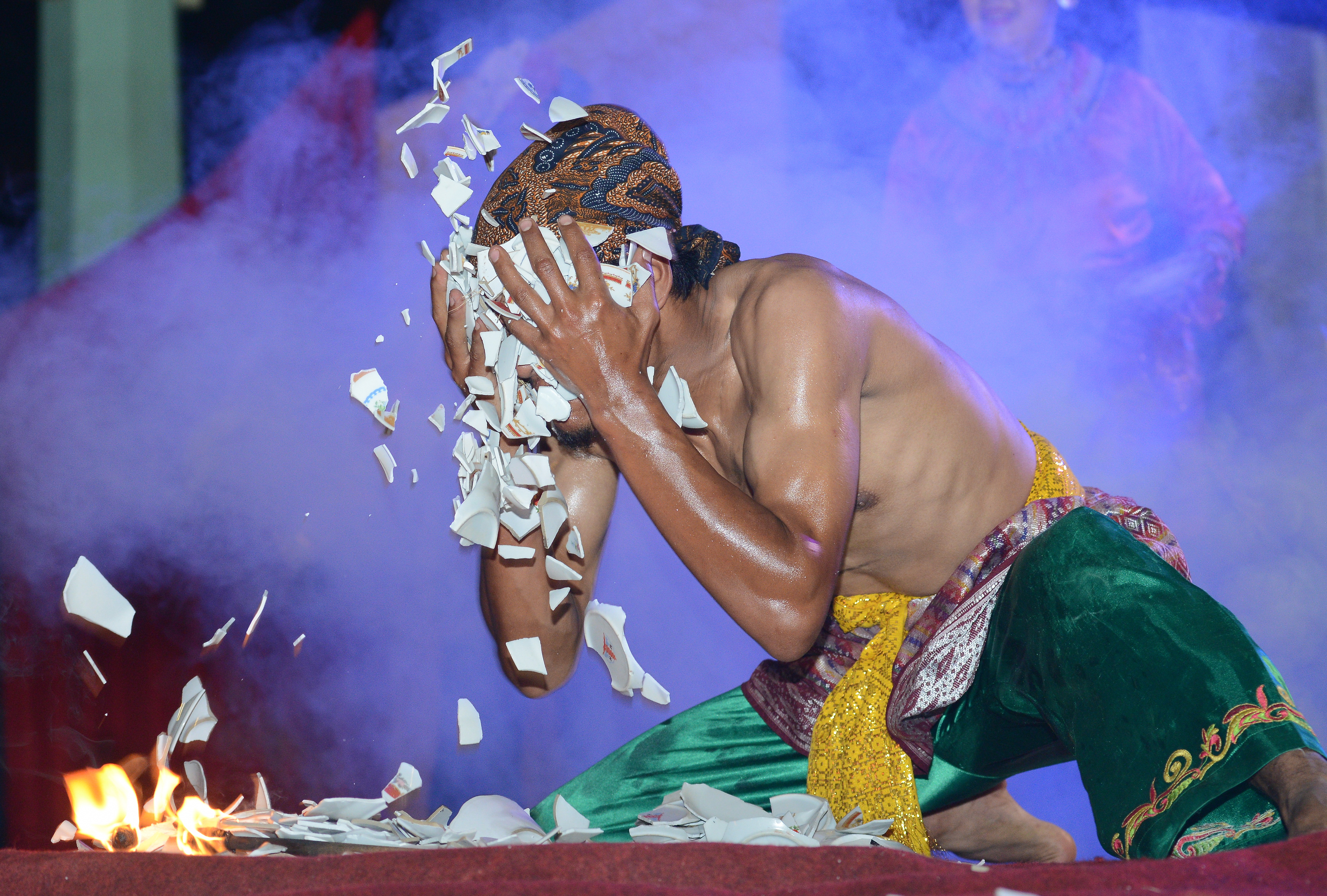

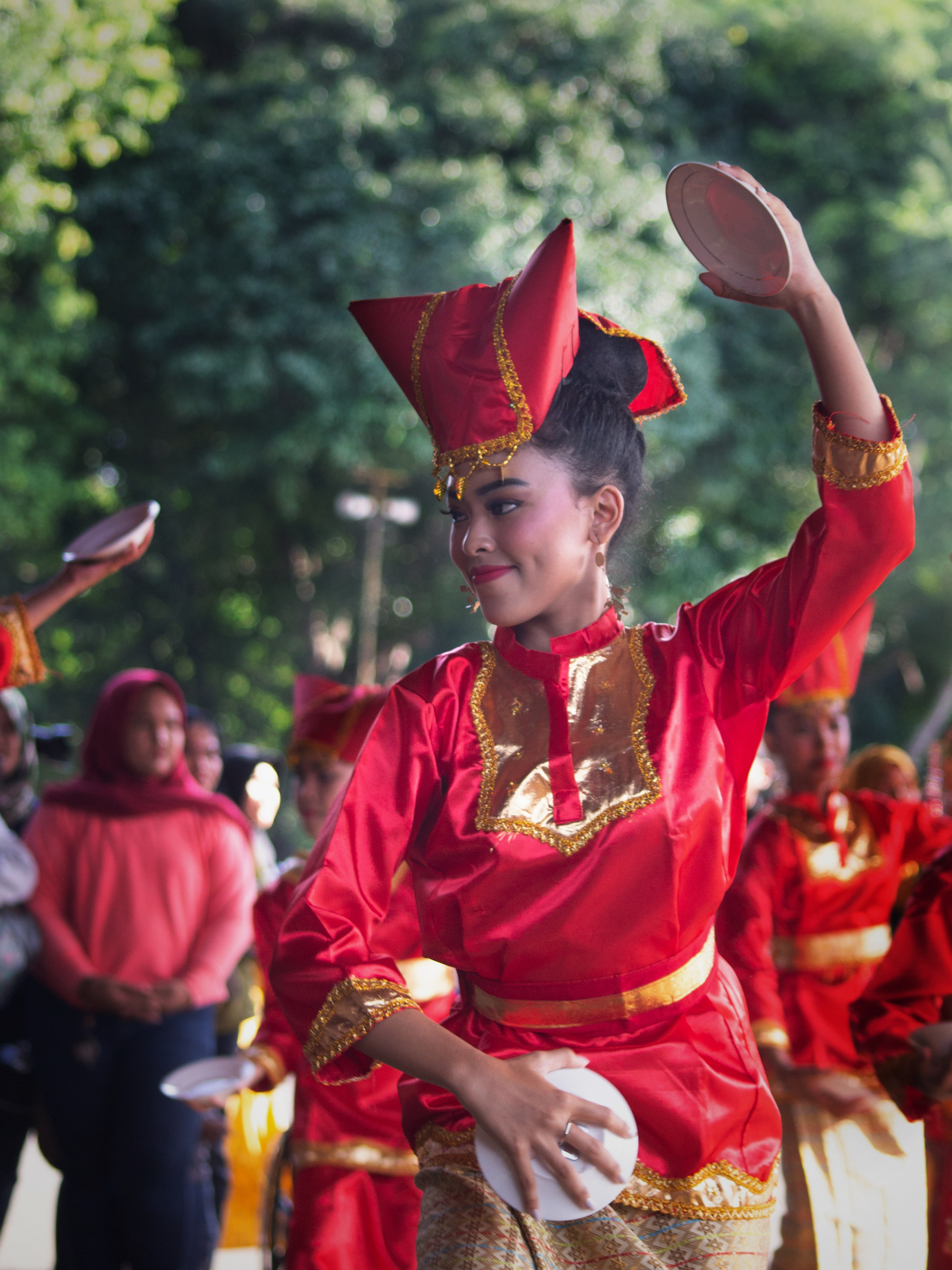

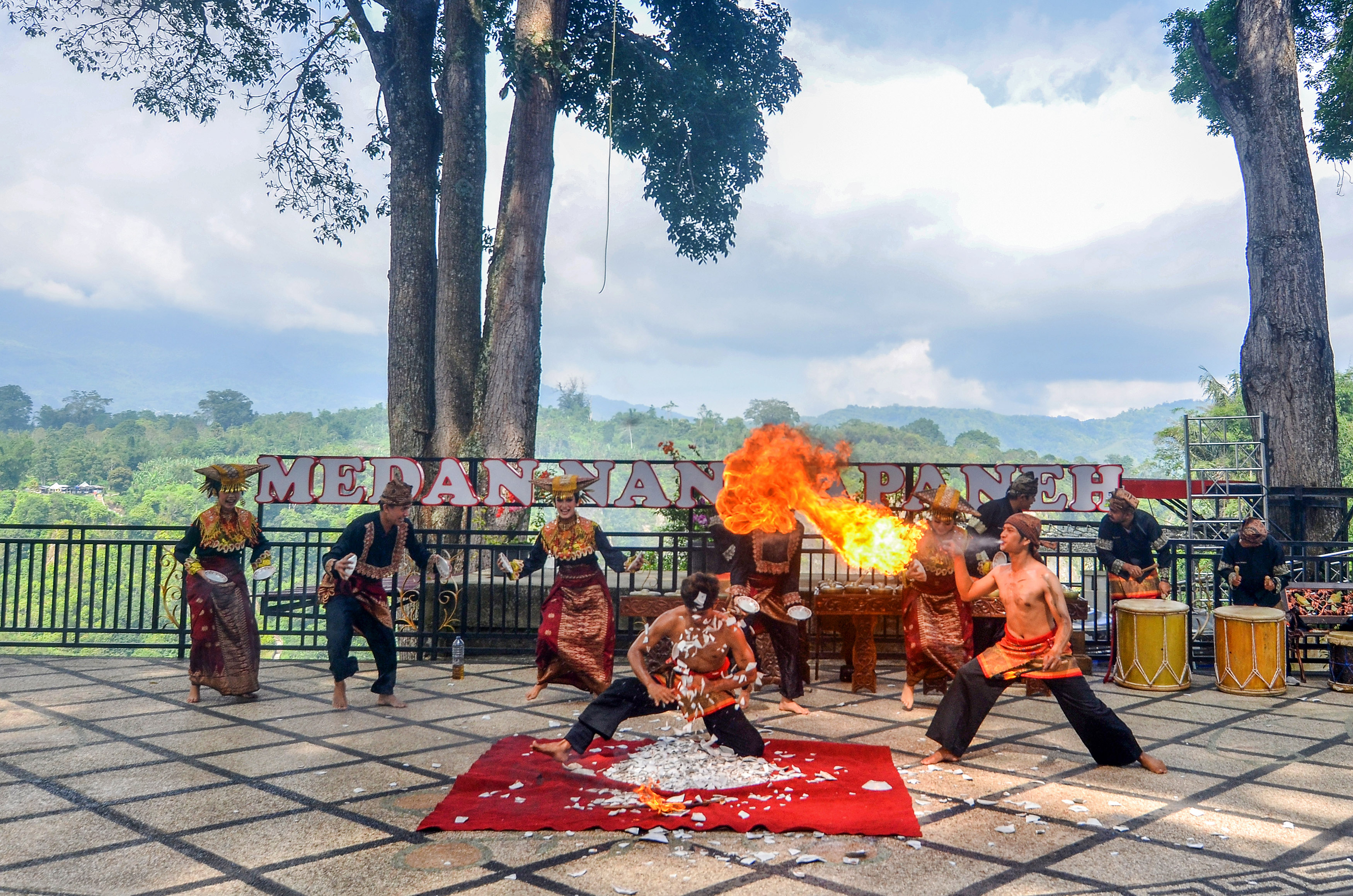

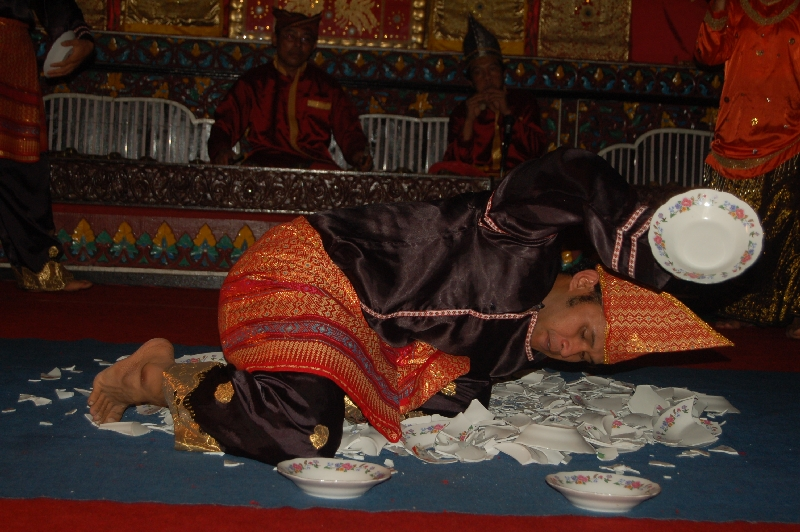

== See also ==
- Candle dance
- Pasambahan
- Payung dance
- Minangkabau
