= Randai =

Indonesian traditional theater

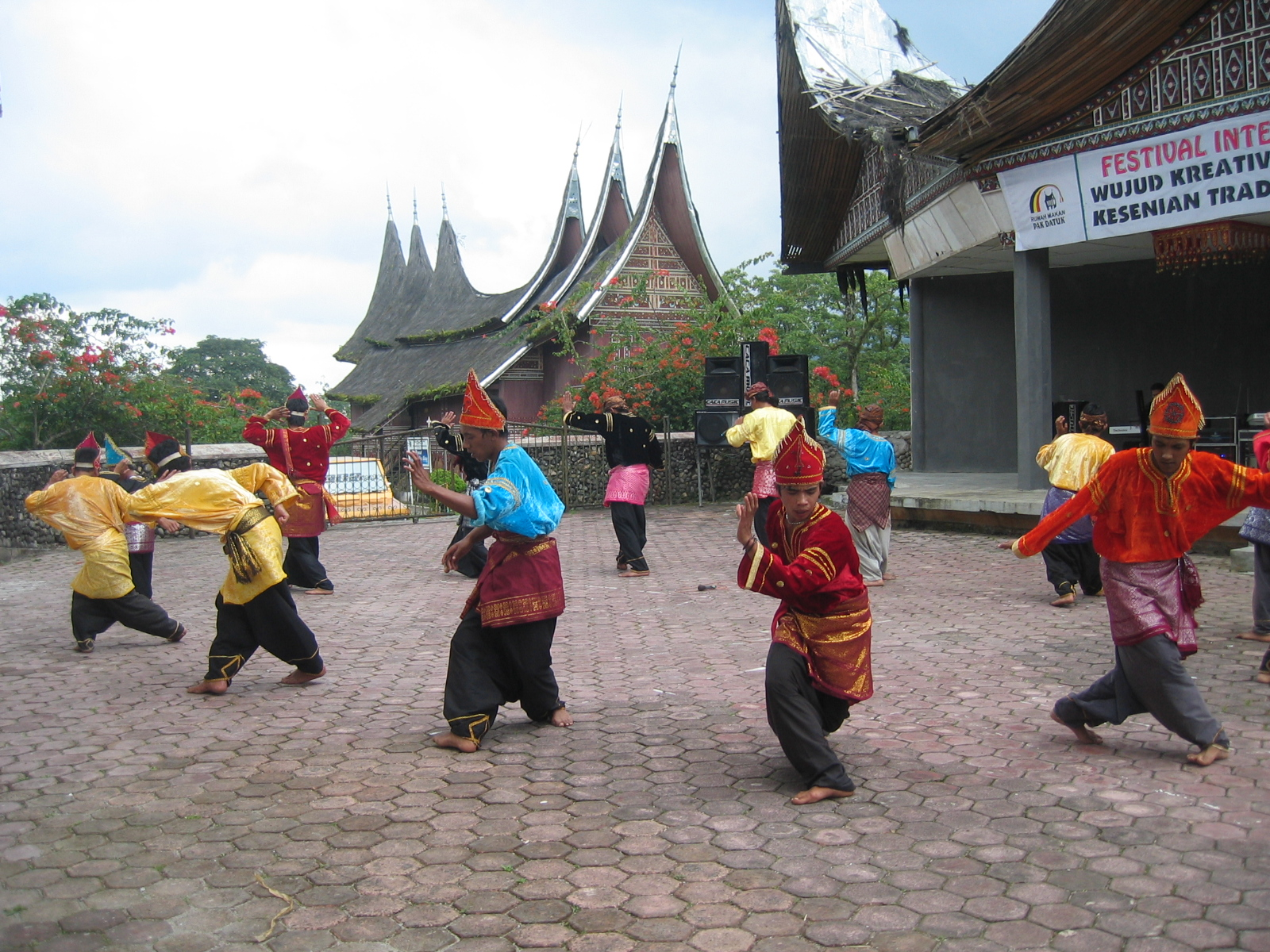
- Randai performance in Padang Panjang
- Types: Traditional pencak silat theatre
- Ancestor arts: Minangkabau
- Originating culture: Minangkabau (Indonesia)

Randai performance video

Randai (Jawi: رنداي) is a folk theater tradition of the Minangkabau ethnic group in West Sumatra, Indonesia, which incorporates music, singing, dance, drama and the martial art of silat. Randai is usually performed for traditional ceremonies and festivals, and complex stories may span a number of nights. It is performed as a theatre-in-the-round to achieve an equality and unity between audience members and the performers. Randai performances are a synthesis of alternating martial arts dances, songs, and acted-out scenes. Stories are delivered by both the acting and the singing and are mostly based upon Minangkabau legends and folktales. Randai originated early in the 20th century out of a fusion of local martial arts, story-telling, and other performance traditions. Men originally played both the male and female characters in the story, but since the 1960s, women have also participated.

== Gallery ==
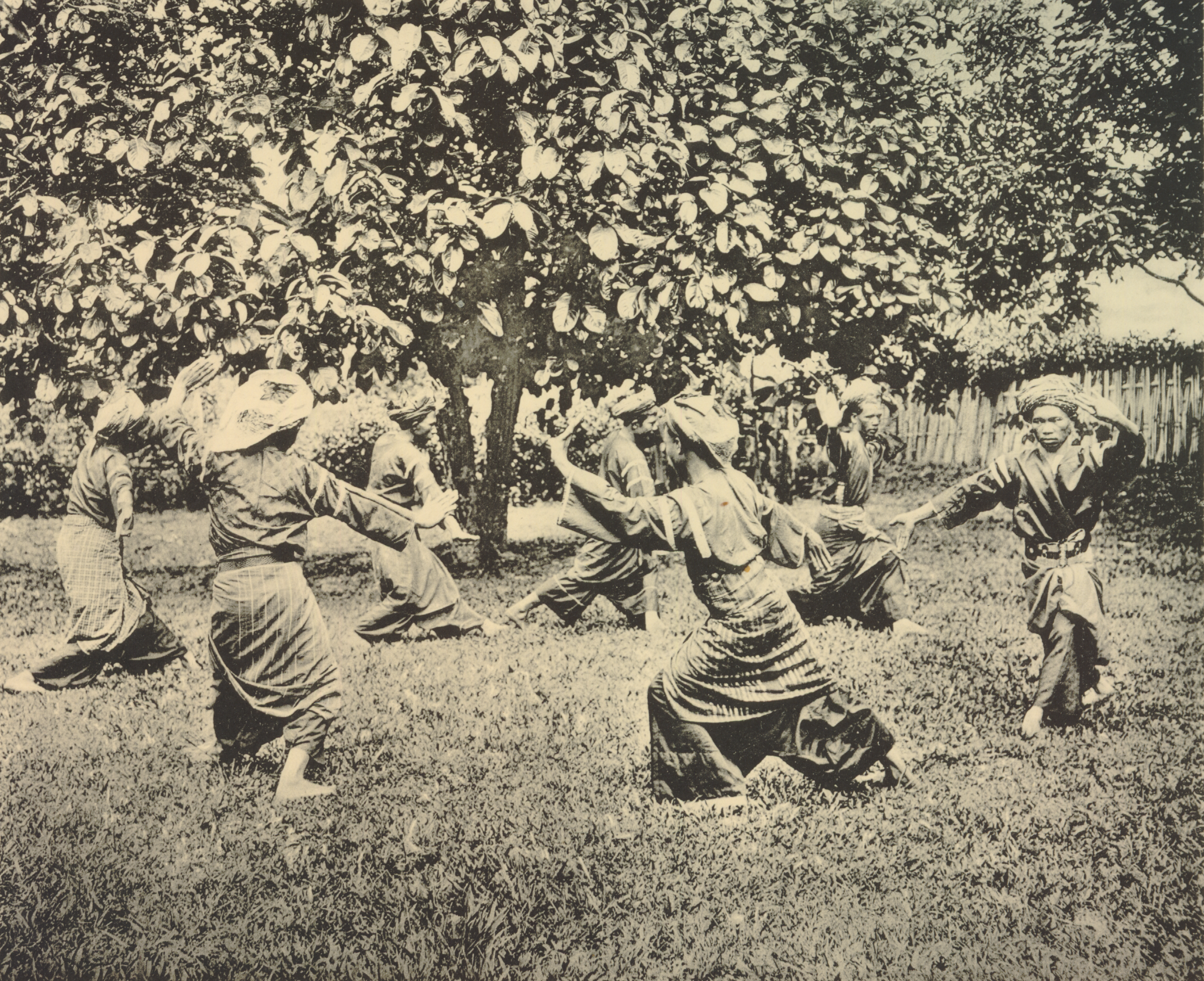

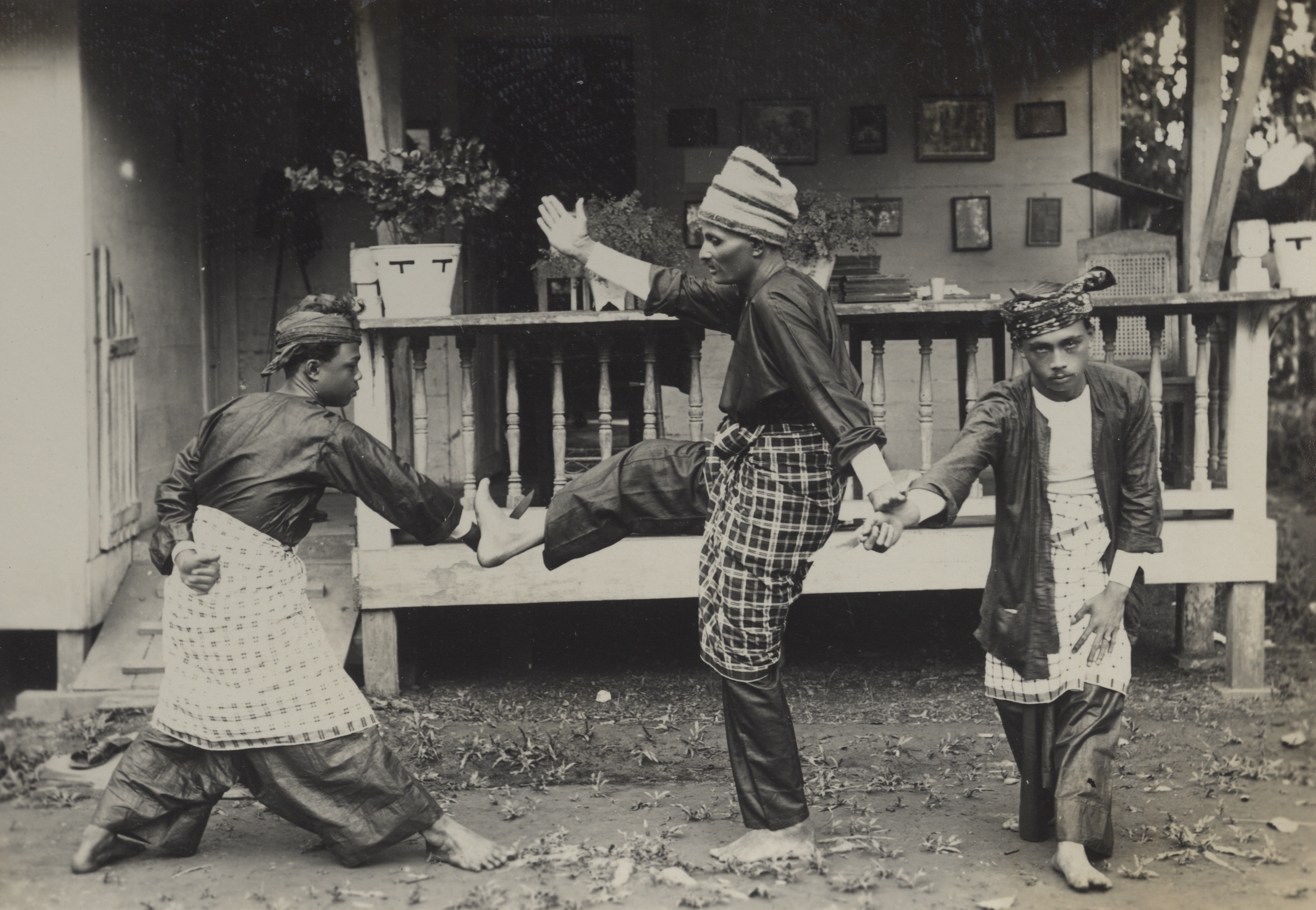

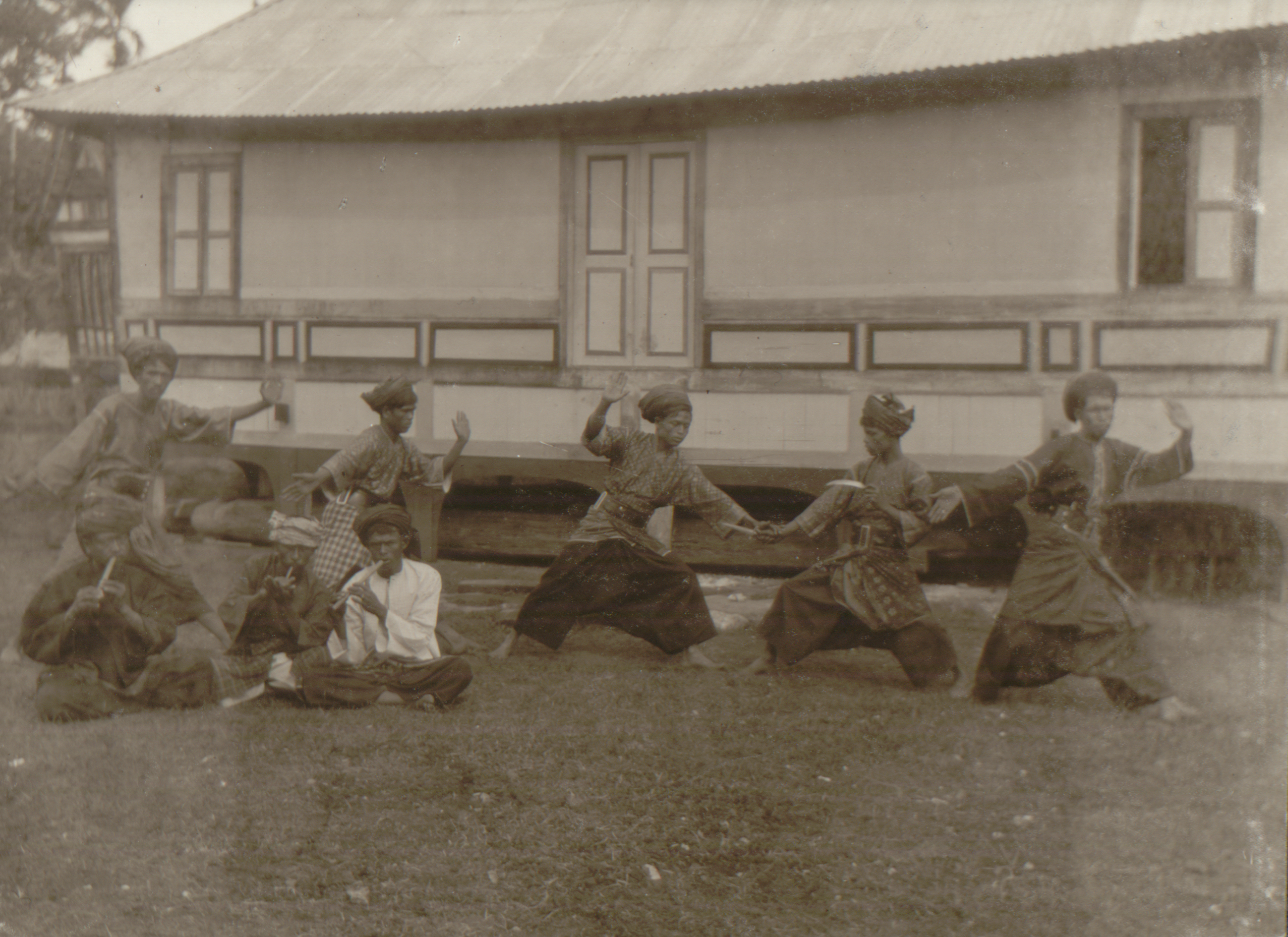

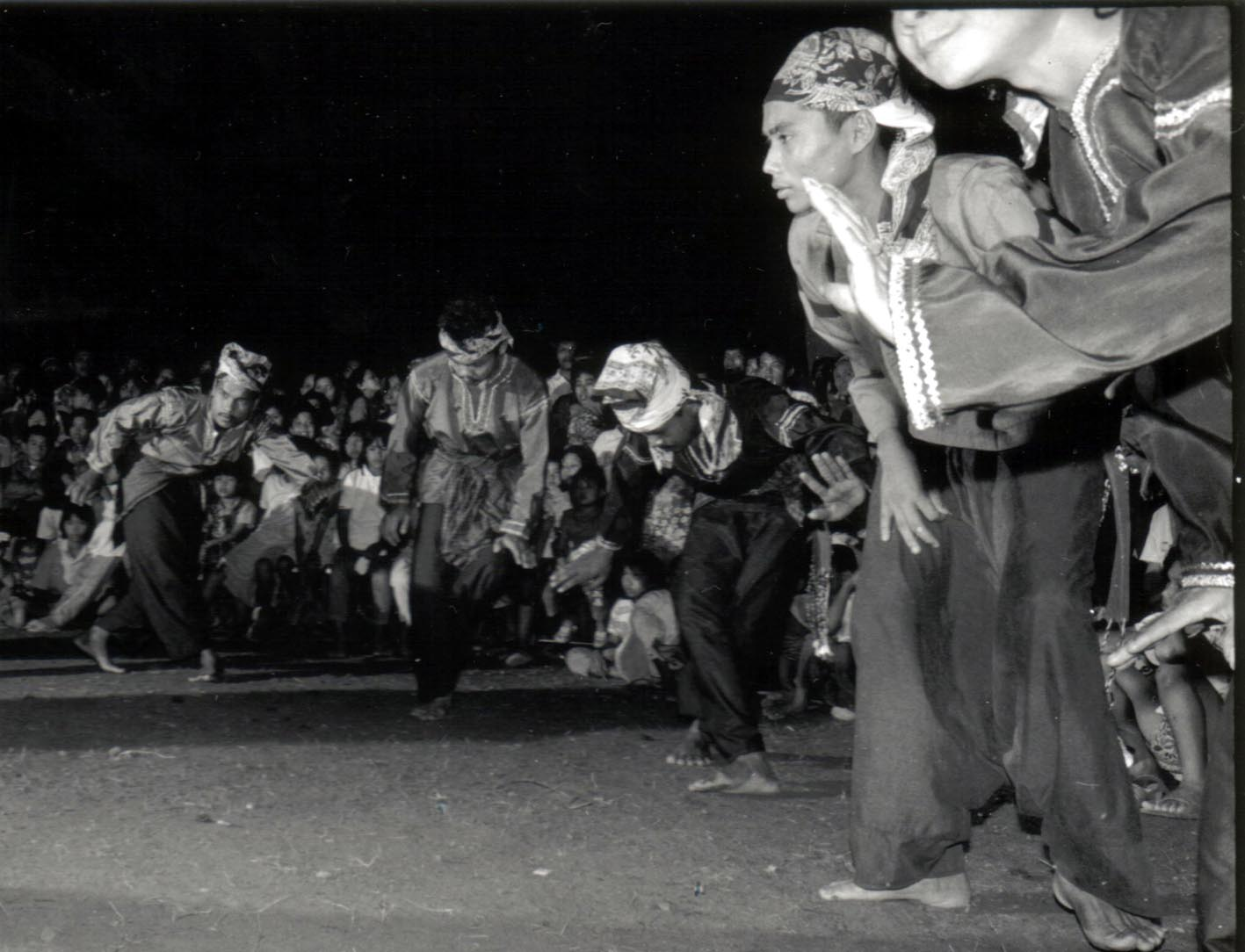

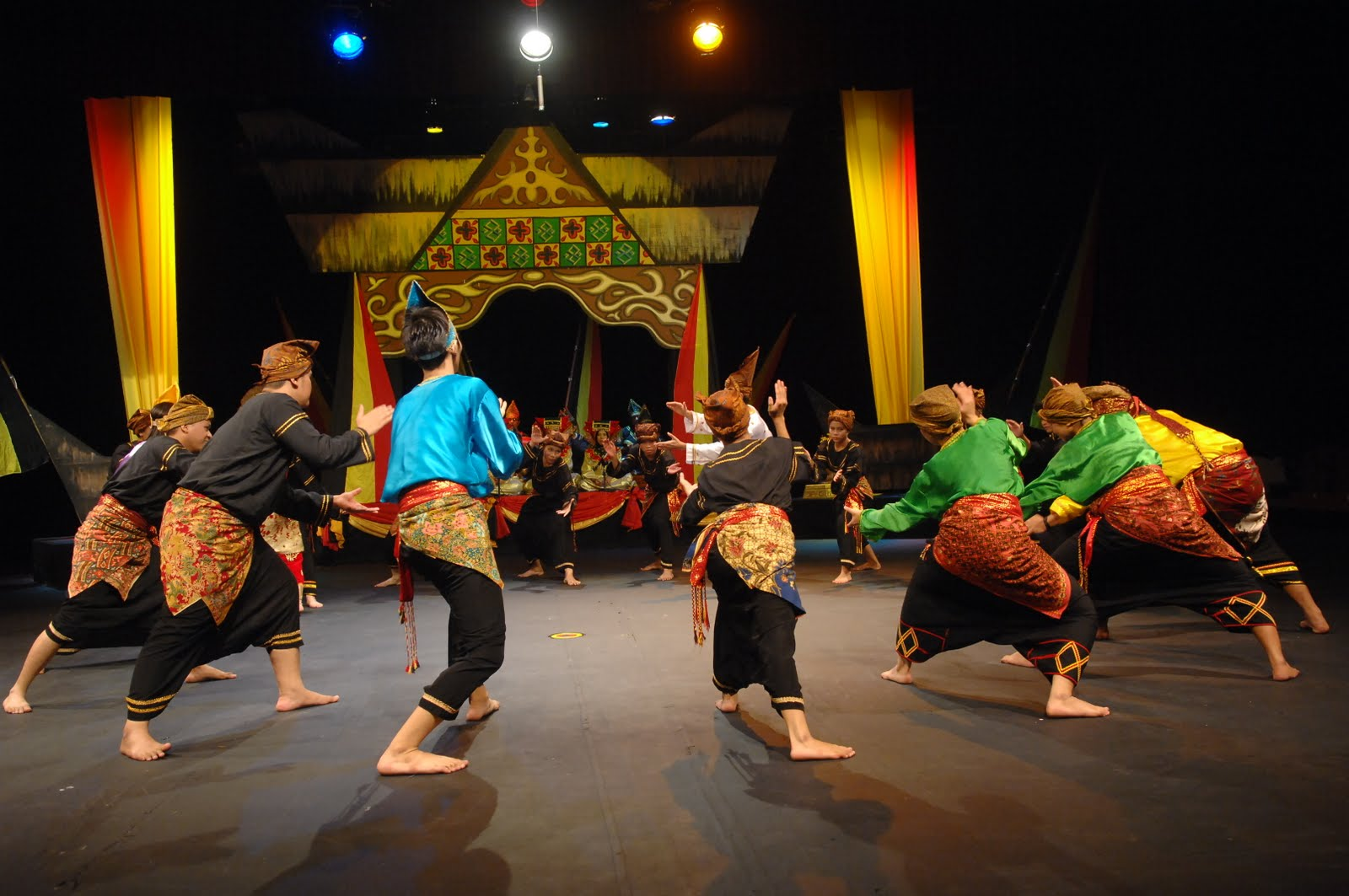

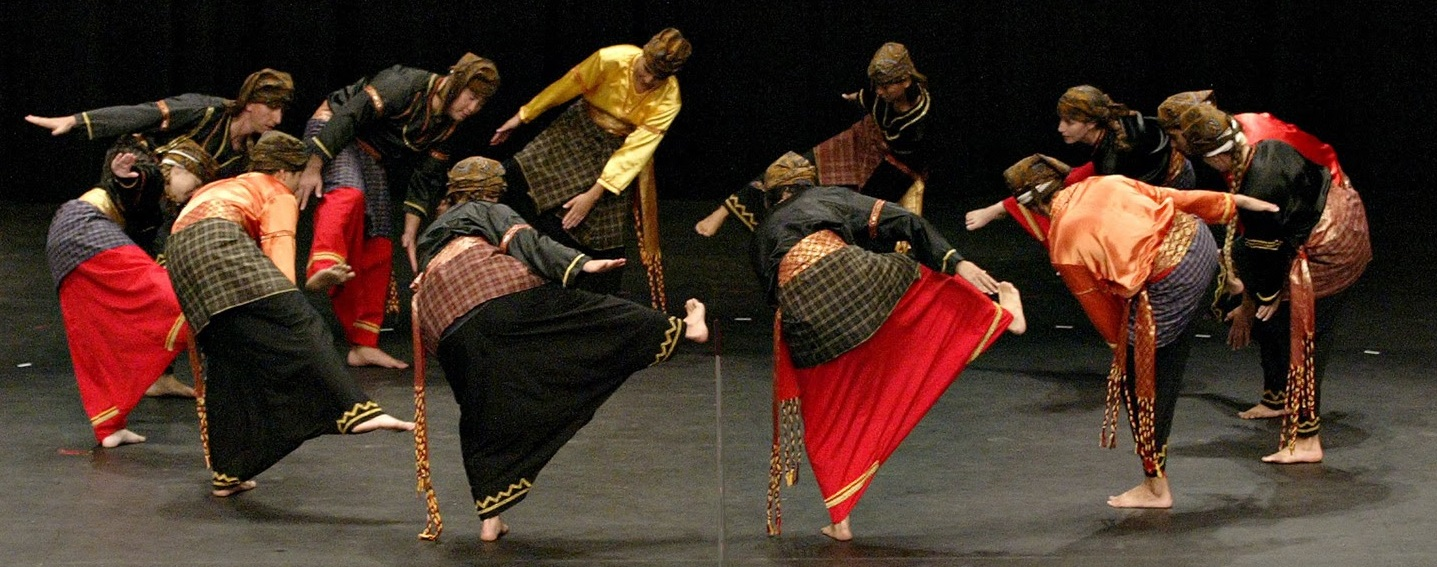

== See also ==
- Piring dance
- Pencak silat
