= Saluang =

Traditional musical instrument of the Minangkabau people

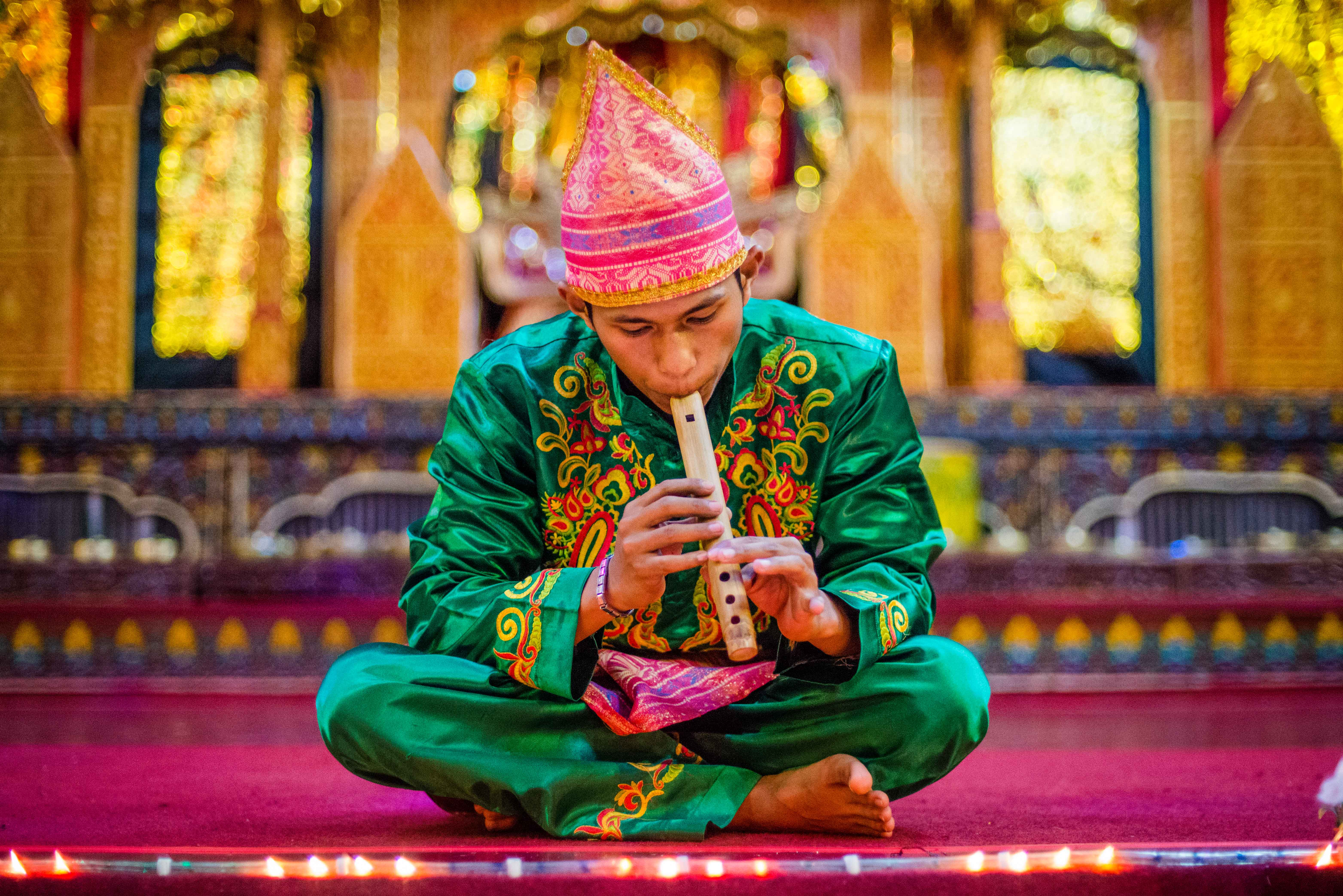
- Saluang performance

Woodwind instrument
- Inventor: Minangkabau
- Developed: Indonesia (West Sumatra)

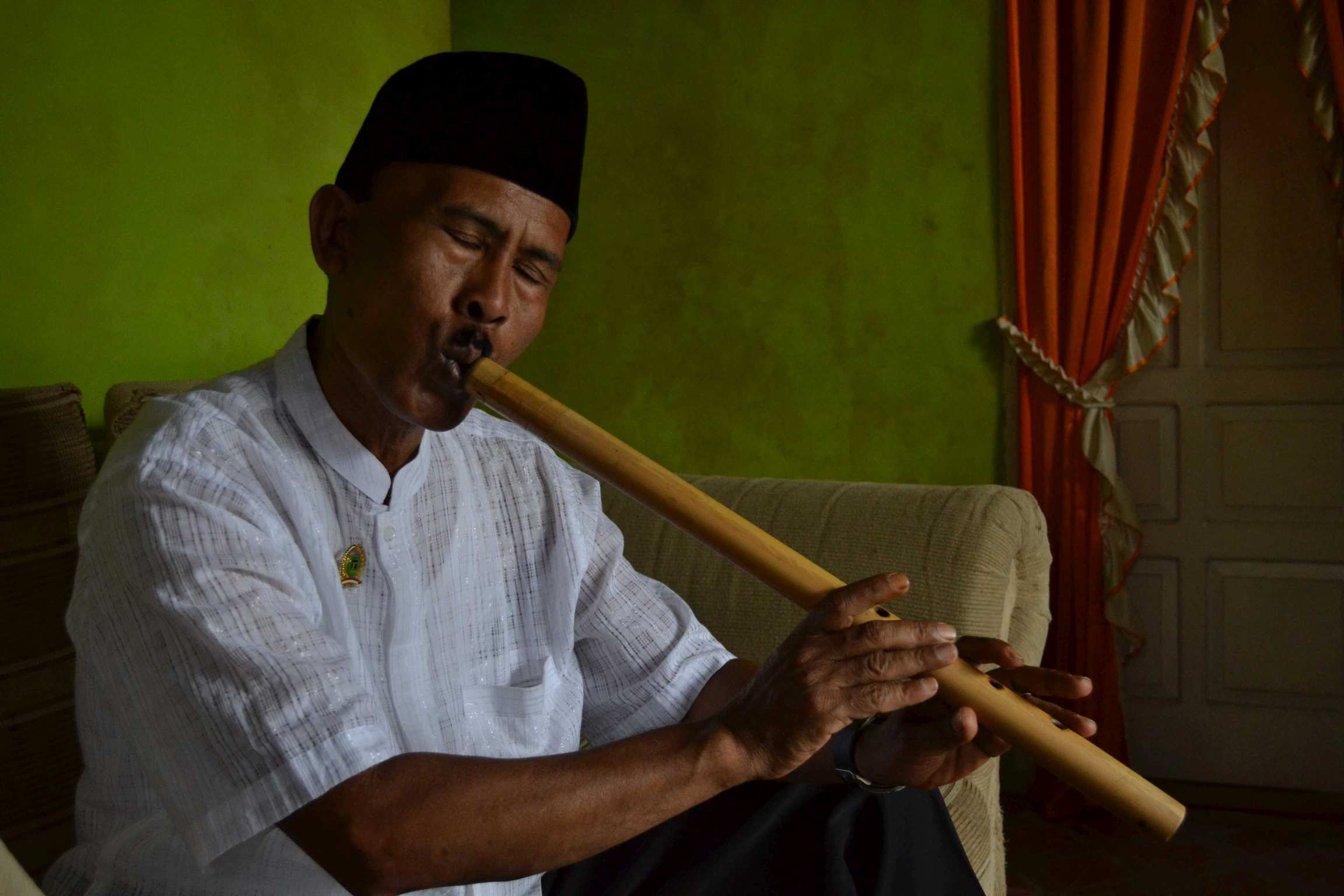
Musician playing saluang.

The saluang is a traditional musical instrument of the Minangkabau people of West Sumatra, Indonesia. It is similar to the ney in general, in that it is an oblique flute, but made of bamboo. It is related to the suling of other parts of Indonesia.

It is made of thin bamboo or "talang" (Schizostachyum brachycladum Kurz), with 4 holes. The end which is blown is beveled, to help direct the player's breath. The dimension of saluang is 3–4 cm in diameter and 40–60 cm in length. It is related to the suling of other parts of Indonesia.

Saluang players use a circular breathing technique to play, which means they can play a song from beginning to end without stopping.

Minangkabau people believe that talang which is collected from rack of clothes dryer or found drifting in the river is a good material for making saluang. Traditionally Minangkabau people also use talang as a container for sticky rice food (lamang, lemang) and as horizontal rack for drying clothes (jemuran kain) under sunlight .

One famous saluang player is Adjis Sutan Sati with saluang female singer Samsimar. Today, it is not so easy to find classic saluang cassette even in original place of saluang (Minangkabau).

Style of saluang tune for example : Singgalang, Pariaman, Koto Tuo, Ratok Solok, Cupak, Salayo and Pauah. Singgalang style is quite difficult for the beginners. High skilled saluang player can play many styles and audience can request any style to them.

In the past, Minangkabau people believed that saluang player have pitunang (mantra) or magic power for hypnotizing the audience. That mantra called as Pitunang Nabi Daud

== See also ==
- Suling
- Talempong
