= Indonesian Celebrity Sports Tournament =

Turnamen Olahraga Selebriti Indonesia
- Formerly: Olimpiade Selebriti Indonesia (early concept)
- Sport: Badminton; Tennis; Table Tennis; Padel; Athletics; Padel; Horse Racing; Archery; Tug of War; Arm Wrestling; Swimming
- Founded: July 4, 2023; 3 years ago
- Founder: Raffi Ahmad; Nagita Slavina
- Owners: SCTV; RANS Entertainment
- Competitors: Various
- Country: Indonesia
- Region: Indonesia
- Venue: Various
- Most recent champion: Cinta Laura 5 times
- Qualification: None
- Broadcaster: SCTV
- Streaming partners: Vidio; RANS Entertainment
- Sponsor: Avian Brands

Indonesian Celebrity Sports Tournament (Indonesian: Turnamen Olahraga Selebriti Indonesia, commonly abbreviated as TOSI) is an Indonesian celebrity sports entertainment competition program broadcast by SCTV and RANS Entertainment on YouTube. The tournament will feature 50+ Indonesian celebrities competing in four sports: Badminton, Tennis, Table Tennis, Padel (New), Athletics, Horse Racing, Archery, Tug of war, Arm Wrestling and Swimming.

Turnamen Olahraga Selebriti Indonesia Season 1 held at the State University of Jakarta (UNJ) area, East Jakarta, July 8, 2023.

The second season started on January 13, 2024. The third season starts on October 12, 2024. The fourth season begins on November 1, 2025.

== History ==
The trend of sports competitions and matches packaged with entertainment has been increasing in Indonesia since the early 2020s. These events are usually initiated by public figures and celebrities and broadcast through their YouTube channels. Some of these events include exhibition Chess matches which Irene Sukandar vs Dadang Subur which is broadcast on the Deddy Corbuzier's YouTube channel on 2021, The series sports entertainment of Vindes Sports initiated by Vincent and Desta to a spin-off of one of Vindes Sport's editions entitled Tiba-Tiba Tenis, which was organized by RANS Entertainment in June 2023.

Based on this, at the end of June 2023, SCTV partnership with RANS Entertainment to hold its own sports entertainment tournament. It is hoped that this program will be an alternative entertainment program in terms of packaging and will also inspire people to be active in sports.

== Participants ==
- Raffi Ahmad
- Nagita Slavina
- Valentino Simanjuntak
- Ibnu Jamil
- Ritchie Ismail
- Gege Elisa
- Callista Arum
- Cinta Brian
- Dion Wiyoko
- Dicky Difie
- Hesti Purwadinata
- Anwar Sanjaya
- Vicky Nitinegoro
- Celine Evangelista
- Fadil Jaidi
- Fujianti Utami Putri
- Abdel Achrian
- Onadio Leonardo
- Muhammad Mulyadi
- Aldi Taher
- Rizky Billar
- Lesti Kejora
- Thariq Halilintar
- Randy Pangalila
- Rezky Adhitya
- Deddy Mahendra Desta (as Mystery Guest)
- Tanta Ginting
- Tarra Budiman
- Bara Valentino
- Aqeela Calista
- Maria Selena
- Maria Vania
- Olivia Jensen (canceled due to injury)
- Bastian Steel
- Naufal Samudra
- Raditya Dika
- Cinta Laura
- Fanny Ghassani
- Sahil Mulachela
- Denny Cagur
- Jirayut
- Andika Mahesa
- Subki Al-Bughury
- Dude Harlino
- Habib Usman
- Ricky Harun

== Season overviews ==
- Season 1: July 8–30, 2023
- Season 2: January 13 – February 5, 2024
- Season 3: October 12 – November 3, 2024
- Season 4: November 1–9, 2025

== Match rules ==
The Indonesian Celebrity Sports Tournament will feature four sports: Badminton, Tennis, Table Tennis, Padel and Athletics. The competition rules for each sport are as follows:

Badminton

- Played by four pairs of celebrities competing in mixed doubles.
- Four pairs of mixed doubles will be drawn to determine the pairs.
- There will be three rounds of matches.
- The points system uses a race to 21 points and two sets. If the match is still tied in the second games, there will be a rubber games.

Tennis

- There will be eight participants competing in three matches.
- The match consisted of two men's singles matches and one mixed doubles match.
- The one-match winner system will be applied in these 3 matches..
- The points system in each match will be in the form of best of 2 (race to 2 sets).

Table Tennis

- There will be eight contestants who will compete individually.
- These eight contestants will be drawn to determine the competition.
- Total 7 matches.
- The points system uses a race to 11 points and a race to 3 sets.

Padel

- Coming Soon

Athletics

- Participants were 12 celebrities consisting of 6 men and 6 women.
- There will be 3 numbers being competed: - 100 meters for men (6 people) - 100 meters for women (6 people) - 400 meters mixed/relay (3 teams)
- For the 400 meter / relay number, participants will be drawn to determine the pairs of 3 teams, each team consisting of 4 people.

== Match charts ==
=== Badminton ===
==== Mens Singles ====
Participants:

1. Raffi Ahmad (Runner-up)
2. Dion Wiyoko (Semifinals)
3. Valentino Simanjuntak (Champions)
4. Dicky Difie (Semifinals)

Semifinals
Raffi A | 21 | 21
Dion W | 14 | 13
Valentino S | 21 | 21
Dicky D | 6 | 17

Final
Raffi A | 16 | 9
Valentino S | 21 | 21

==== Mixed Doubles ====
Participants:

1. Fadil Jaidi / Fujianti Utami Putri (Semi finals)
2. Cinta Brian / Callista Arum (Champions)
3. Anwar Sanjaya / Celine Evangelista (Semi finals)
4. Vicky Nitinegoro / Hesti Purwadinata (Runner-up)

Semifinals
Fadil J Fuji U P | 15 | 16
Cinta B Callista A | 21 | 21
Anwar S Celine E | 9 | 21
Vicky N Hesti P | 21 | 23

Final
Cinta B Callista A | 21 | 21
Vicky N Hesti P | 15 | 16

=== Table Tennis ===
==== Men's Singles ====
Participants:

1. Rizky Billar (Semi finals)
2. Aldi Taher (Quarter finals)
3. Onadio Leonardo (Semi finals)
4. Muhammad Mulyadi (Quarter finals)
5. Sahil Mulachela (Quarter finals)
6. Denny Cagur (Runner-up)
7. Thariq Halilintar (Quarter finals)
8. Abdel Achrian (Champions)

Quarter finals
Abdel A | 13 | 23 | 21 | 21
Thariq H | 21 | 21 | 17 | 19
Onadio L | 11 | 11 | 9 | 11
M Mulyadi | 7 | 4 | 11 | 8
Sahil M | 14 | 13 | 7
Denny C | 21 | 21 | 21
Aldi T | 12 | 15 | 11
Rizky B | 21 | 21 | 21

Semifinals
Abdel A | 19 | 21 | 25 | 21
Onadio L | 21 | 12 | 23 | 4
Denny C | 21 | 21 | 19 | 21
Rizky B | 14 | 18 | 21 | 14

Final
Abdel A | 21 | 21 | 21
Denny C | 12 | 9 | 11

== Match schedule and results ==
The Indonesian Celebrity Sports Tournament will be held from July 8 to July 30, 2023. Each match day will consist of at least two different sports..

Legend
| P | Preliminary round | Q | Qualification | H | Heats | ½ | Semi-finals | F | Final |

Ref
| Dates | Jul 8 | | Jul 9 | | Jul 15 | | | Jul 16 | | Jul 22 | | | Jul 23 | | | Jul 29 | | Jul 30 | | | |
| Sports | 1 | 2 | 1 | 2 | 1 | 2 | 3 | 1 | 2 | 1 | 2 | 3 | 1 | 2 | 3 | 1 | 2 | 1 | 2 | 3 | 4 |
Men's
| Men's singles badminton | | ½ | | ½ | | | | | | | | F | | | | | | | | | |
| Badminton – Exhibition Men's Singles | | | | | | F | | | | | | | | | | | | | | | |
| Men's singles tennis | | | | | | | | | | | | | | | | F | | | | | |
| Men's doubles tennis | | | | | | | | | | | | | | | | | | F | | | |
| Badminton – Exhibition Men's Doubles | | | | | | | | | | | | | | F | | | | | | | |
| Men's singles table tennis | P | | P | | | | P | P | | ½ | | | ½ | | | | F | | | | |
| Men's 100 m run | | | | | | | | | | | | | | | | | | F | | | |
Women's
| Women's 100m run | | | | | | | | | | | | | | | | | | | F | | |
Mixed Doubles
| Mixed doubles badminton | | | | | | | | | | | ½ | | | | ½ | | | | | | F |
| Badminton – Exhibition Mixed Doubles | | | | | | | | | F | | | | | | | | | | | | |
| Mixed doubles tennis | | | | | F | | | | | | | | | | | | | | | | |
Mixed Athletics
| Mixed relay 4 × 100 m | | | | | | | | | | | | | | | | | | | | F | |

Match schedule and results
Saturday, July 8, 2023
| Matches | Win | Lose | Scores | | | | |
|---|---|---|---|---|---|---|---|
| Men's singles table tennis qualifying | Onadio Leonardo | Muhammad Mulyadi | 11–7, 11–4, 9–11, 11–8 (Note: The match between Onadio and Mulyadi was the only match to use an 11-point rally system. Since the match between Thariq and Abdel, a 21-point rally system has been used, but the number of games won has remained the same.) | | | | |
| Men's singles badminton semifinals | Raffi Ahmad | Dion Wiyoko | 21–14, 21–13 | | | | |
Sunday, July 9, 2023
| Matches | Win | Lose | Scores | | | | |
| Men's singles table tennis qualifying | Abdel Achrian | Thariq Halilintar | 13–21, 23–21, 21–17, 21–19 | | | | |
| Men's singles badminton semifinals | Valentino Simanjuntak | Dicky Difie | 21–6, 21–17 | | | | |
Saturday, July 15, 2023
| Matches | Win | Lose | Scores | | | | |
| Mixed doubles tennis final | Ibnu Jamil / Gege Elisa | Jeje Govinda / Nagita Slavina | 7–5, 7–6^{(7–2)} | | | | |
| Men's singles badminton exhibition | Jirayut | Andika Mahesa | 15–8, 15–7 | | | | |
| Men's singles table tennis qualifying | Denny Cagur | Sahil Mulachela | 21–14, 21–13, 21–7 | | | | |
Sunday, July 16, 2023
| Matches | Challenger 1 | Challenger 2 | Scores | | | | |
| Men's singles table tennis qualifying | Rizky Billar | Aldi Taher | 21–12, 21–15, 21–11 | | | | |
| Mixed doubles badminton exhibition | Lesti Kejora / Rizky Billar | Raffi Ahmad / Nagita Slavina | 21–10, 21–11 | | | | |
Saturday, July 22, 2023
| Matches | Challenger 1 | Challenger 2 | Scores | | | | |
| Men's singles table tennis semifinals | Onadio Leonardo | Abdel Achrian | 21–19, 12–21, 21–23, 4–21 | | | | |
| Mixed doubles badminton semifinals | Anwar Sanjaya / Celine Evangelista | Vicky Nitinegoro / Hesti Purwadinata | 9–21, 21–23 | | | | |
| Men's singles badminton final | Raffi Ahmad | Valentino Simanjuntak | 16–21, 9–21 | | | | |
Minggu, July 23, 2023
| Matches | Challenger 1 | Challenger 2 | Scores | | | | |
| Men's singles table tennis semifinals | Denny Cagur | Rizky Billar | 21–14, 21–18, 19–21, 21–14 | | | | |
| Mixed doubles badminton semifinals | Fadil Jaidi / Fuji Utami | Cinta Brian / Callista Arum | 15–21, 16–21 | | | | |
| Men's Doubles Badminton Exhibition | Dude Herlino / Subki Al Bughury | Ricky Harun / Habib Usman | 21–16, 21–18 | | | | |
Saturday, July 29, 2023
| Matches | Challenger 1 | Challenger 2 | Scores | | | | |
| Men's singles table tennis final | Abdel Achrian | Denny Cagur | 21–12, 21–9, 21–11 | | | | |
| Men's singles tennis | Randy Pangalila | Rezky Aditya | 1–6, 1–6 | | | | |
Sunday, July 30, 2023
| Matches | Challenger 1 | Challenger 2 | Scores | | | | |
| Mixed doubles badminton final | Vicky Nitinegoro / Hesti Purwadinata | Cinta Brian / Callista Arum | 15–21, 16–21 | | | | |
| Matches | Challenger 1 | Challenger 2 | Scores | | | | |
| Men's doubles tennis | Raffi Ahmad / Desta | Rezky Aditya / Tanta Ginting | 4–6, 6–2, 6–4 | | | | |
| Matches | Challenger 1 | Challenger 2 | Challenger 3 | Challenger 4 | Challenger 5 | Challenger 6 | Winners |
| Men's 100 meter run | Raditya Dika | Bastian Steel | Bara Valentino | Tarra Budiman | Anwar Sanjaya | Naufal Samudra | Bastian Steel |
| Women's 100 meter run | Cinta Laura | Fuji | Aqeela Calista | Maria Vania | Fanny Ghassani | Maria Selena | Cinta Laura |
| Matches | Challenger 1 | Challenger 2 | Challenger 3 | Winners | | | |
| Mixed 400 meter relay race | Raditya Dika Bastian Steel Cinta Laura Aqeela Calista | Bara Valentino Anwar Sanjaya Fanny Ghassani Fuji | Tarra Budiman Naufal Samudra Maria Vania Maria Selena | Raditya Dika Bastian Steel Cinta Laura Aqeela Calista | | | |

== Final results ==
=== Season 1 (2023) ===
| Sports | Gold | Silver | Bronze |
|---|---|---|---|
| Men's singles badminton | Valentino Simanjuntak | Raffi Ahmad | Dion Wiyoko |
| Men's singles badminton | Valentino Simanjuntak | Raffi Ahmad | Dicky Difie |
| Badminton – Men's singles exhibition | Jirayut | Andika Mahesa | —N/a |
| Men's singles tennis | Rezky Aditya | Randy Pangalila | —N/a |
| Men's doubles tennis | Raffi Ahmad; Desta | Rezky Aditya; Tanta Ginting | —N/a |
| Badminton – Men's doubles exhibition | Dude Harlino; Subki Al-Bughury | Ricky Harun; Habib Usman | —N/a |
| Men's singles table tennis | Abdel Achrian | Denny Cagur | Onadio Leonardo |
| Men's singles table tennis | Abdel Achrian | Denny Cagur | Rizky Billar |
| Men's 100m run | Bastian Steel | Tarra Budiman | Naufal Samudra |
| Women's 100m run | Cinta Laura | Maria Selena | Fanny Ghassani |
| Mixed doubles badminton | Cinta Brian; Callista Arum | Vicky Nitinegoro; Hesti Purwadinata | Anwar Sanjaya; Celine Evangelista |
| Mixed doubles badminton | Cinta Brian; Callista Arum | Vicky Nitinegoro; Hesti Purwadinata | Fadil Jaidi; Fujianti Utami Putri |
| Badminton – mixed doubles exhibition | Rizky Billar; Lesti Kejora | Raffi Ahmad; Nagita Slavina | —N/a |
| Mixed doubles tennis | Ibnu Jamil; Gege Elisa | Ritchie Ismail; Nagita Slavina | —N/a |
| Mixed relay 4 × 100 m | Raditya Dika; Bastian Steel; Cinta Laura; Aqeela Calista | Naufal Samudra; Tarra Budiman; Maria Vania; Maria Selena | Bara Valentino; Anwar Sanjaya; Fanny Ghassani; Fujianti Utami Putri |

=== Season 2 (2024) ===
| Sports | Gold | Silver | Bronze |
|---|---|---|---|
| Mixed Doubles Tennis | Raffi Ahmad; Nagita Slavina | Tanta Ginting; Denalta Eunike | —N/a |
| Men's 100m Athletics | Jirayut | Bastian Steel | Ditto Percussion |
| Women's 100m Athletics | Cinta Laura | Flavio Zaviera | Nirina Zubir |
| Men's 400m Athletics | Bastian Steel | Ditto Percussion | Jirayut |
| Women's 400m Athletics | Cinta Laura | Nirina Zubir | Gisella Anastasia |
| Athletics Mixed Relay 400 m | Cinta Laura; Jirayut; Rassya Hidayah; Anissa Aziza | Ditto Percussion; Raffi Ahmad; Nirina Zubir; Flavio Zaviera | Bastian Steel; Aldi Taher; Gisella Anastasia; Sahila Hisyam |
| Mixed Doubles Badminton | Surya Insomnia; Hesti Purwadinata | Thariq Halilintar; Aaliyah Massaid | —N/a |

== Awards and nominations ==
| Tahun | Award | Kategori | Hasil |
|---|---|---|---|
| 2023 | Asian Television Awards 2023 | Best Sports Programme | Won |
| 2025 | Indonesian Television Awards 2025 | Most Popular Sports Programs | Nominated |
