= Defri Juliant =

Indonesian singer and actor

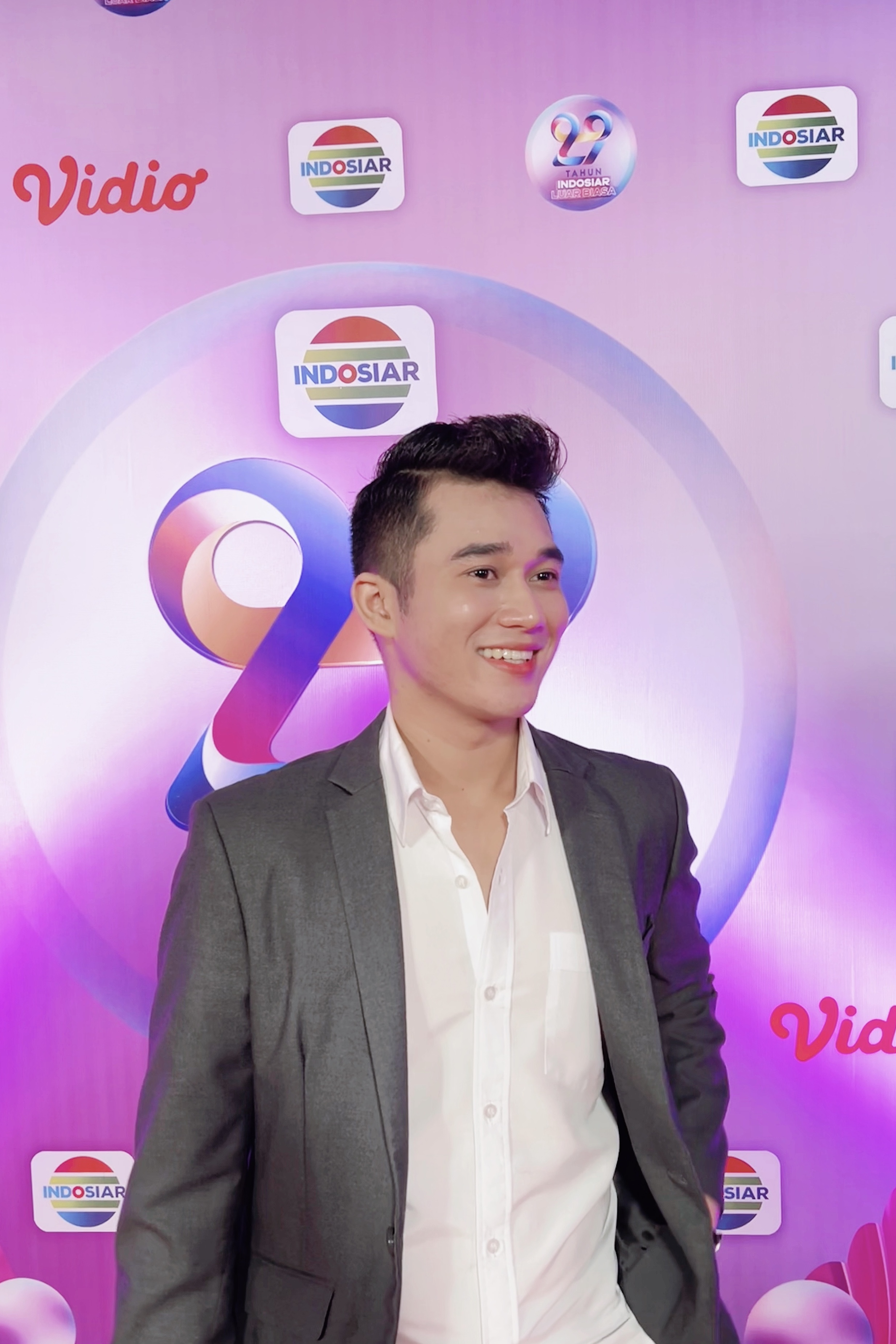
- Juliant in 2024
- Born: Arif Defri Arianto; December 28, 2002 (age 23); Bangkinang, Kampar, Riau, Indonesia
- Other name: Defri Juliant
- Education: Persada Bunda
- Occupations: Singer; actor; presenter
- Years active: 2019–present
- Known for: Liga Dangdut Indonesia 2020
- Height: 175 cm (5 ft 9 in)
- Musical career
- Genres: Dangdut; malay; pop
- Instrument: Vocals
- Labels: Koko; Julshie; ZD
- Website: defrijuliant.com

Arif Defri Arianto (born December 28, 2002), known professionally as Defri Juliant, is an Indonesian singer and actor. He rose to fame for being a finalist of the third season of Liga Dangdut Indonesia representing the province of Riau, broadcast by the Indonesian television channel Indosiar in 2020. After the competition, Juliant has released an album and five singles. He also participated in the D'Academy 5 competition representing Kampar Regency.

== Life and career ==
=== 2002–2019: Early life ===
Arif Defri Arianto was born on December 28, 2002. He was born and raised in Bangkinang, Kampar, Riau to Julianto dan and Susilawati. He came from a family of musicians, both of his parents work as stage singers. He is the third of five children, with older brothers Andre Fikri Akbar and Nugie Riandi Jufenel and younger brothers Muhammad Haikal Julsie and Noufal Oktaviano. His younger brother, Haikal, died in a motorcycle accident on February 10, 2020. Juliant has had a hobby of singing since childhood, he started singing at the age of 9. Juliant was educated at SD Negeri 008 Langgini and SMP Negeri 2 Bangkinang Kota. While in high school at SMK Negeri 1 Kuok, majoring in Freshwater Fishery Agribusiness, he often won singing competitions, such as 2nd place in FLS2N Vocational High School Kampar Regency in 2017 and 2018. In 2017, Juliant was elected as Riau Youth Ambassador 2017. He was also selected as the third winner Bujang Kampar in the 2018 Bujang Dara event in Kampar Regency. In 2019, he auditioned for 2019 Liga Dangdut Indonesia, but only reached the Video Booth stage and was not called to be the representative of the province at that time. In the same year, he participated in the TVRI Riau Dangdut Star event. Juliant is currently studying at STISIP Persada Bunda, majoring in Communication Studies.

=== 2020–2021: Liga Dangdut Indonesia and career beginnings ===
Juliant returns to audition for the 2020 Liga Dangdut Indonesia competition. He was chosen to be one of the five participants representing Riau. Juliant competed for two tickets to represent Riau Province in front of the judges. For his performances through the songs "Keangkuhan", "Madu", and "Syahdu" (a duet with Rara), he was declared qualified to take part in the final concert on the 2020 Liga Dangdut Indonesia stage.

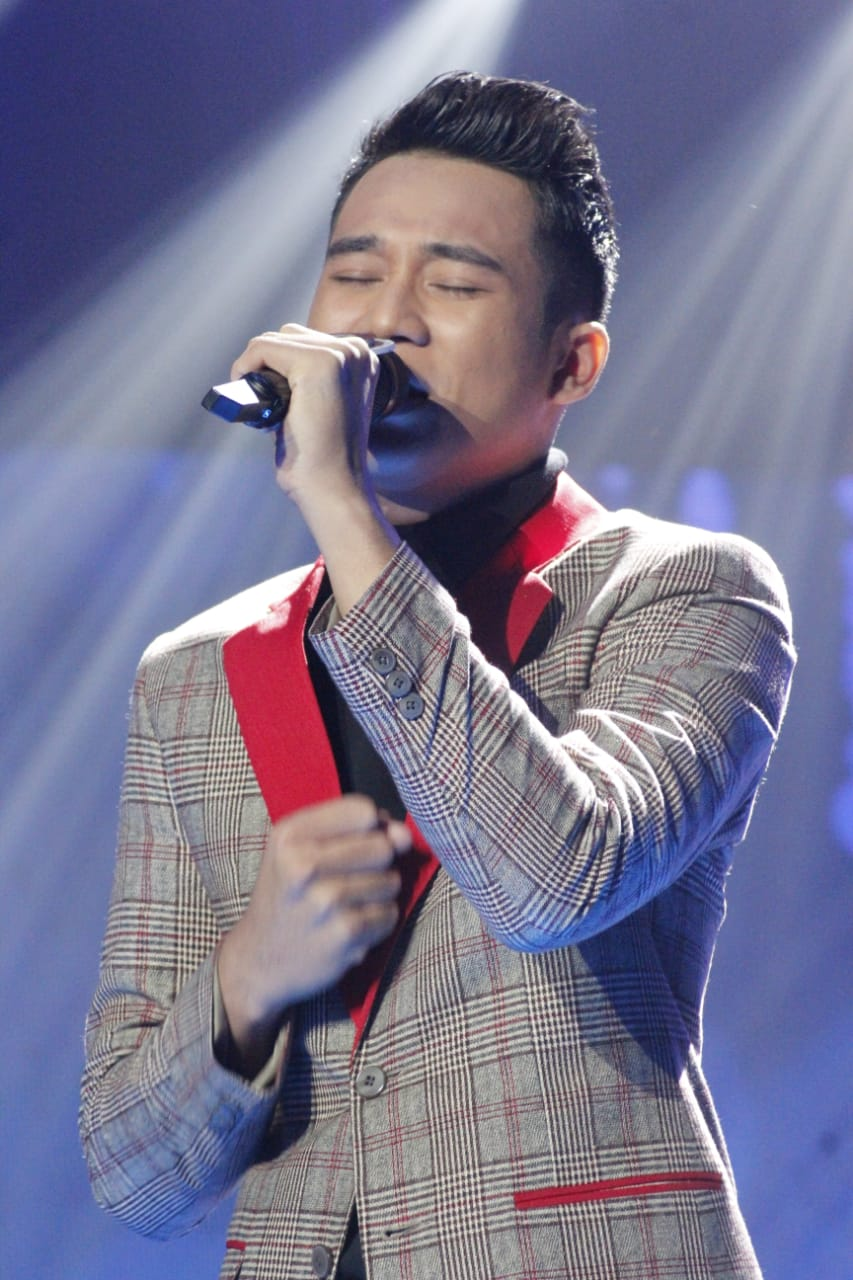
Juliant at Liga Dangdut Indonesia 2020

Seventy participants who passed to the 2020 Liga Dangdut Indonesia Final Concert round were divided into fourteen groups (seven groups of red teams and seven groups of white teams). In the Top 70 round, Juliant made his first appearance on the fourteenth day, singing again the song "Keangkuhan" by original artist Wawa Marisa. In that round, he advanced to the Top 56 round. In the Top 56 round, he performed the song "Kehilangan" by the original singer Rhoma Irama. He advanced to the next round with the highest percentage result.

After his performance which always gets the highest percentage result in every round, Juliant was eliminated in the Top 18 round when he sang Jamal Abdillah's "Gadis Melayu". He has a fandom called Fandef.

Liga Dangdut Indonesia season 3 performances and results
Week #	Song choice	Original artist	Group	Percentage	Result
Audition	"Keangkuhan"	Wawa Marisa	–	–	Advance
Audition	"Madu"	Amriz Arifin & Erni AB	–	–	Advance
Audition	"Syahdu"	Rhoma Irama	A duet with Tiyara Ramadhani	–	Advance
Top 70	"Keangkuhan"	Wawa Marisa	Group 7 (White team)	29,88%	First to Safe
Top 56	"Kehilangan"	Rhoma Irama	Group 4 (White team)	34,22%	First to Safe
Top 44	"Madu"	Amriz Arifin	Group 5	39,03%	First to Safe
Top 33	"Semakin Sayang Semakin Kejam"	Rita Sugiarto	Group 6 (a duet with Aulia)	39,93%	First to Safe
Top 24	"Titip Cintaku"	Ona Sutra	Group 6	34,14%	First to Safe
Top 18	"Gadis Melayu"	Jamal Abdillah	Group 2	33,18%	Eliminated

In August 2021, Juliant through Koko Record HD released his debut single entitled "Tiara Ku Di Pulau Batam" which was composed by Rio Astar. A week after the release of his debut single, he duets with fellow 2020 Liga Dangdut Indonesia participant, Puspa Indah, released a song titled "Cinta Mati" which was composed by Evan Budyana. The next month, he returned to a duet with Puspa Indah, releasing a song titled "Seringgit Dua Kupang" which was also composed by Rio Astar. Juliant released another solo single "Pemburu Harta" in October.

Koko Record released Defri Juliant's debut album, whose title is a homonym of his name, Defri Juliant on February 16, 2022, with "Tiara Ku Di Pulau Batam" as a lead single. After his contract with Koko Record ended, Juliant produced his own songs under his independent label Julshie Entertainment. He released his first independent single, "Biarkan Semua Berlalu" on May 13, 2022. The song is a Malay pop genre based on the story of his past which was written with Ali Ocumond and the music was arranged by Decky Ryan. His second independent single, "Ibu" was released on July 15, 2022. The song was dedicated to his mother as a birthday gift.

=== 2022–present: D'Academy and acting debut ===
Two years after the Liga Dangdut Indonesia competition, Juliant returned to compete in a talent search event broadcast by Indosiar. He had the opportunity to D'Academy 5 artist jury audition, performing "Milikku" by A. Rafiq and winning a golden ticket. Juliant was again passed the final audition by performing "Doa Suci" by Imam S. Arifin, "Hilang Tak Berkesan" by Muchsin Alatas and "Pandangan Pertama" by A. Rafiq. The video of his performance with ""Pandangan Pertama" in final audition has entered the Indonesian YouTube trending. After his performance at the DA 5 Final Audition which received high enthusiasm, Koko Record released the music video "I Love You" on August 27, his duet with Puspa Indah has previously been released as the opening track of his first album.

In the Fifty-Fifty round, Juliant performed a duet "Bunga Surga" by Rhoma Irama and "Datang untuk Pergi" by Elvy Sukaesih with Lingling. They performance earned standing ovation from the entire jury but he was eliminated in this round. Juliant had the opportunity to perform in the Wildcard round and received three standing ovations from the judges when he performed Muchsin Alatas' "Sudah Tahu Aku Miskin", but he failed to return to the competition.

D'Academy 5 performances and results
Week #	Song choice	Original artist	Group	Result
Audition	"Milkku"	A. Rafiq	–	Golden Ticket
Final audition	"Pandangan Pertama"	A. Rafiq	Group 7	Advance
Final audition	"Doa Suci"	Imam S. Arifin	Group 7	Advance
Final audition	"Hilang Tak Berkesan"	Muchsin Alatas	Group 7	Advance
Fifty-Fifty	"Bunga Surga"	Rhoma Irama	Group 7 (Duet with Lingling)	Eliminated
Fifty-Fifty	"Datang untuk Pergi"	Elvy Sukaesih	Group 7 (Duet with Lingling)	Eliminated
Fifty-Fifty	"Akhir Sebuah Cerita"	Evie Tamala	Group 7 (Quartet with Lala, Lingling, and Salwa)	Eliminated
Wildcard	"Sudah Tahu Aku Miskin"	Muchsin Alatas	Grup 2	Failure
Wildcard	"Biarlah Merana"	Rita Sugiarto	Group 2 (Quintet with Alivia, Natasya, Salwa, and Mardon)	Failure

After failing to advance in D'Academy 5, Juliant got the opportunity to make his acting debut. He starred in Pintu Berkah television film by Mega Kreasi Films.

== Artistry ==
=== Influences and musical style ===
In an interview with Tribun, Defri said that his idols in dangdut music were Erie Suzan and Mansyur S. His musical style was also heavily influenced by his childhood music, which was dangdut. In addition, Defri is also influenced by the music of his native region, where he has released a single with the Malay genre.

=== Stage name ===
Defri Juliant official logo

At the beginning of the Liga Dangdut Indonesia competition, Defri used the mononym Arif for the stage name. It was later changed to Defri because there is participants with the same name. After the competition, Defri created a last name for his stage name, Juliant, from his father name Julianto.

== Discography ==
=== Album ===
- Defri Juliant (2022)

=== Singles ===
Title	Year	Album	Label
“Tiara Ku Di Pulau Batam”	2021	Defri Juliant	Koko Record HD
“Cinta Mati” (with Puspa Indah)	2021	Non-album single	Koko Record HD
“Seringgit Dua Kupang” (with Puspa Indah)	2021	Non-album single	Koko Record HD
“Pemburu Harta”	2021	Non-album single	Koko Record HD
“Biarkan Semua Berlalu”	2022	Non-album single	Julshie Entertainment
“Ibu”	2022	Non-album single	Julshie Entertainment
“Ditikam Rindu”	2023	Non-album single	ZD Management

== Filmography ==
=== Television series ===
Year	Title	Role	Note	Production	Channel
2022	Pintu Berkah	Aldi	Episode: Kesabaran Anak Yatim Piatu Penjual Kue Pancong Lumer Berhasil Mewujudkan Cita-Citanya	Mega Kreasi Films	Indosiar
2022	Pintu Berkah	Bakti	Episode: Mustajab Doa Tukang Oncom Bandung Yang Rela Berjuang Demi Adiknya	Mega Kreasi Films	Indosiar
2022	Pintu Berkah	Hardy	Episode: Penjual Rajungan Keliling Yang Sukses Menjadi Pengusaha Pengekspor Rajungan	Mega Kreasi Films	Indosiar
2022	Pintu Berkah	Firman	Episode: Dari Anak Penjual Papeda Keliling Menjadi Manager Sukses	Mega Kreasi Films	Indosiar
2022	Pintu Berkah	Ridho	Episode: Lika-liku Hidup Pedagang Es Goyang Bersama Anak Yatim Piatu Yang Di Rawatnya	Mega Kreasi Films	Indosiar
2022	Pintu Berkah	Danang	Episode: Akhir Indah Penjual Es Tebu Yang Berhati Mulia	Mega Kreasi Films	Indosiar
2023	Pintu Berkah	Bagas	Episode: Anak Pembuat Nisan Jadi Pengusaha Sukses	Mega Kreasi Films	Indosiar
2023	Pintu Berkah	Jaka	Episode: Penjual Jagung Rebus Yang Berhasil Meraih Cita-citanya Jadi Seorang Sarjana	Mega Kreasi Films	Indosiar
2023	Pintu Berkah	Aldi	Episode: Abu Gosok Menjadi Saksi Perjuangan Anakku Mendapatkan Gelar Sarjana	Mega Kreasi Films	Indosiar
2023	Pintu Berkah	Zainal	Episode: Cita-Cita Mulia Bapak Pedagang Sempol Yang Diuji Oleh Anak Kandungnya Sendiri	Mega Kreasi Films	Indosiar
2023	Pintu Berkah	Rafi	Episode: Tekad Kuat Pemburu Bekicot Yang Ingin Kuliah Sampai Sarjana	Mega Kreasi Films	Indosiar
2023	Pintu Berkah	Imron	Episode: Guru Desa Pengrajin Sapu Lidi yang Ingin Memajukan Desa	Mega Kreasi Films	Indosiar
2023	Pintu Berkah	Irham	Episode: Doa Ibu Yang Menghantarkan Buruh Kios Giling Daging Sukses Menjadi Pengusaha Sosis	Mega Kreasi Films	Indosiar
2023	Pintu Berkah	Akmal	Episode: Suka Duka Anak Pembuat Gypsum Yang Berhasil Mengembalikan Kejayaan Usaha Ayahnya	Mega Kreasi Films	Indosiar
2023	Pintu Berkah	Ozan	Episode: Angan Pembuat Arang Batok Kelapa Yang Ingin Membebaskan Keluarganya Dari Kepulan Asap Kemiskinan	Mega Kreasi Films	Indosiar

=== Television show ===
Year	Program	Role	Channel	Note
2019	Bintang Dangdut	Performer	TVRI Riau	Thirs season
2020	Konser Bhinneka Tunggal Ika Liga Dangdut Indonesia 2020	Performer	Indosiar	Special event
2020	Liga Dangdut Indonesia 2020	Peserta	Indosiar	Third season
2022	D'Academy	Peserta	Indosiar	Fifth season
2022	Happy New Year Indonesia 2023	Performer	Indosiar	Special event
2023	Konser Raya 28 Tahun Indosiar Lua28iasa	Performer	Indosiar	Special event
2023	Pagi-Pagi Ambyar	Performer	Trans TV	Speech title
2023	Emak-Emak Jagoan	Performer	RTV	Game show
2023	Malam Anugerah Gatra Kencana 2023	Performer	TVRI	Awards event
2023	Brownis (Obrowlan Manis)	Performer	Trans TV	Speech title
2023	Family 100	Performer	MNCTV	Game show
2023	Pagi-Pagi Ambyar	Performer	Trans TV	Speech title

=== Web series ===
Year	Title	Role	Note
2023	Laras	Rifki	

=== Web event ===
Year	Title	Role	Channel
2020	Kepoin LIDA ZOZO	Participant	Vidio
2022	Bestie D'Academy	Participant	Vidio
2022	Behind The Scene Panggilan	Presenter	Vidio
2022	BTS DA5	Presenter	Vidio
