= Liga Dangdut Indonesia =

Indonesian singing competition

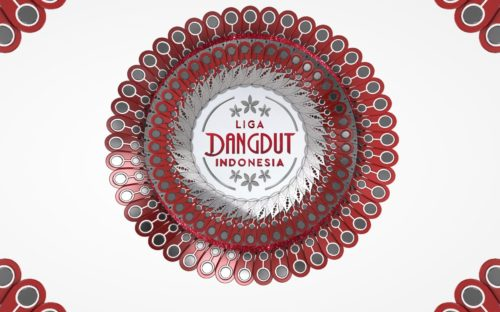
- Also known as: Liga Dangdut Indonesia: Seni Menyatukan
- Genre: Reality competition
- Presented by: Arie Kriting (Season 1); Ayu Dewi (Season 1); Gilang Dirga (Season 1–4); Ramzi (Season 1–4); Upiak Isil (Season 1); Indra Bekti (Season 2); Irfan Hakim (Season 1–4); Jirayut (Season 2–4); Rizky Billar (Season 3–4); Tiara Ramadhani (Season 3–4); Mario Pratama (Season 4); Meli Nuryani (Season 4); Narendra Pawaka (Season 4); Putri Isnari (Season 4); Robby Purba (Season 4); Ruben Onsu (Season 4); Sheila Purnama (Season 4)
- Judges: Elvy Sukaesih (Season 1–4); Dewi Persik (Season 1–4); Inul Daratista (Season 1–4); Soimah Pancawati (Season 1–4); Nassar (Season 1–4); Erie Suzan (Season 1–2); Zaskia Gotik (Season 1–3); Rita Sugiarto (Season 1, 3, 4); Rosalina Musa (Season 1); Samuel Watimena (Season 1); Ikke Nurjanah (Season 1); Iyeth Bustami (Season 1); Caren Delano (Season 2–3); Eko Tjandra (Season 2, 4); Fomalhaut Zamel (Season 2, 4); Defrico Audy (Season 2, 4); Lesti (Season 3–4); Muhammad Irsyad Basir (Season 3); Fildan Rahayu (Season 3–4); Weni Wahyuni (Season 3–4); Nita Thalia (Season 3–4); Diana Putri (Season 3–4); Evi Anggraini (Season 4); Yosep Sinudarsono (Season 4)
- Theme music composer: Estepe
- Country of origin: Indonesia
- Original language: Indonesian
- No. of seasons: 4
- No. of episodes: 260

Production
- Running time: 180 minutes
- Production companies: Indonesia Entertainmen Produksi; Surya Citra Media

Original release
- Network: Indosiar
- Release: 15 January 2018 – 23 August 2021

Liga Dangdut Indonesia (Indonesian Dangdut League) is an Indonesian dangdut singing competition television series produced by Indonesia Entertainmen Produksi and distributed by Surya Citra Media. It aired on Indosiar from 15 January 2018 to 23 August 2021.

The concept of the series involves discovering recording stars from unsigned singing talents who come from every province in Indonesia, with the winner determined by Indonesian viewers using phones, Internet, and SMS text voting. The winners of the first fourth seasons, as chosen by viewers, are Selfiyani, Fauzul Abadi, Meli Nuryani, and Rahmadonal Muhammad Iqhbal. Some of the notable finalists from this event were Tiyara Ramadhani, Selfi Yamma, and Defri Juliant. Liga Dangdut Indonesia employs a panel of vocal and fashion judges who criticize the contestants' performances.

This show received a world record from the Indonesian World Records Museum as "The talent search program with the most participants and from the most provinces".
