= List of people from Riau =

This is a listing of notable people born in, or notable for their association with, Riau.

== B ==
- Sutardji Calzoum Bachri, poet (Indragiri Hulu)

== J ==
- Defri Juliant, dangdut singer

== O ==
- Leani Ratri Oktila, para-badminton athlete

== S ==
- Darwin Zahedy Saleh, Minister of Energy and Mineral Resources (Indragiri Hilir)
- Abdul Somad, Islamic preacher
- Atika Suri, TV newscasters and newscast producer (Indragiri Hulu)
- Syamsuar, politician, governor of Riau for 2019–2024 (Rokan Hilir)
