= Sajadah Ka'bah =

Sajadah Kaaba
- Film poster
- Directed by: Rhoma Irama
- Written by: Rhoma Irama; Asep Kusdinar
- Produced by: Erna Pelita
- Starring: Rhoma Irama; Ida Iasha; Ruhut sitompul Ridho Rhoma; Michella Adlen; Leroy Osmani; Zahwa Aqilah; Nurul Qomar
- Distributed by: Falcon Pictures Pictures & Rk23
- Release date: 17 November 2011
- Country: Indonesia
- Language: Indonesian

Sajadah Ka'bah (lit. 'The Kaaba prayer mat') is an Indonesia drama which was released on 17 November 2011, directed by Rhoma Irama and starring Rhoma Irama and Ida Iasha.

== Synopsis ==
Rhoma Irama, a traveler who is visiting mosques in Lombok in order to silahturahmi and symbols ukhuwah Islamiyah with the managers of the mosque there belonging to Fahmi Tamami forum. Assisted by his friend Fahru, Rhoma becomes acquainted with religious leaders in Lombok to accidentally Rhoma met a widow, who had a daughter Sohiba, Sai'ma, the mosque became the target Towi, a businessman who intends to change the mosques and houses Sohiba tesebut be gambling The Lombok.

Towi also has managed to manipulate Ridho, child Rhoma Rhoma so that not only opposition from Towi and the thugs alone, but also of his own in the seizure of the mosque and impede efforts Sohiba ground that in the drill Towi. Ridho against his father, because his love is mixed with only daughter Towi.

Not willing to see mosques functioned over into gambling, Rhoma finally accepted the challenge to duel with Towi to determine who is entitled to the mosque and the house Sohiba, while the men intimidate Towi Sohiba and daughter and stole a piece of the new prayer rugs woven pictorial ka'ba Sohibah.

== Starring ==
- Rhoma as Rhoma Irama
- Towi as Ruhut sitompul
- Sohiba as Ida Iasha
- Ridho as Ridho Rhoma
- Princess Towi as Michella Adlen
- Sai'ma as Zahwa Aqilah
- Komar as H. Nurul Qomar
