= D'Academy =

- Created by: Programming Indosiar
- Presented by: Ramzi (Season 1–present); Rina Nose (Season 1–4, Season 7–present); Irfan Hakim (Season 1–5); Andhika Pratama (Season 2–3); Gilang Dirga (Season 3–present); Ruben Onsu (Season 5–6); Jirayut (Season 5–present); Tiyara Ramadhani (Season 5–6); Rizky Billar (Season 5, Season 7–present); Kier King (Season 6); Zahra Sima (Season 7); Andi Syaqirah (Season 8)
- Judges: Inul Daratista (Season 1–4); Iis Dahlia (Season 1–4); Zaskia Gotik (Season 1); Saipul Jamil (Season 1–3); Rita Sugiarto (Season 1–5); Beniqno (Season 1–4); Hetty Koes Endang (Season 3, Season 6); Elvy Sukaesih (Season 4); Dewi Persik (Season 4–present); Iyeth Bustami (Season 4 & 7); Soimah Pancawati (Season 5–present); Via Vallen (Season 5); Jenita Janet (Season 5–present); Lesti (Season 5–present); Reza Zakarya (Season 5); Fildan Rahayu (Season 5); Nassar Sungkar (Season 5 & 8); Denada (Season 6); Happy Asmara (Season 6); Aldi Taher (Season 6); Wika Salim (Season 7–present)
- Opening theme: D'Academy (Theme Song)
- Composer: Estepe
- Country of origin: Indonesia
- No. of seasons: 7

Production
- Running time: 240 minutes
- Production companies: Indosiar Production Team; Indonesia Entertainmen Produksi

Original release
- Network: Indosiar
- Release: 3 February 2014 – present

Related
- D'Academy Asia

D'Academy or DA (lit. 'Dangdut Academy') is the second present and second largest dangdut music talent show in Indonesia. Production is conducted by Indosiar Production Team (November 2015 - March 2016) and Indonesia Entertainmen Produksi (April 2016 - December 2017). The show is one of the most successful talent competition shows in Indonesia. The show's success has resulted in the creation of two spin-off series, those being D 'Academy Celebrity, which features celebrities, and D' Academy Asia, which features contestants from around Southeast Asia.

DA is open for any Indonesian citizens between the ages of 15 and 28 who are not already signed to a record label. All participants who successfully pass the audition process receive training in the form of choreography, vocal performance, personality and fashion advice from some experts in their respective fields, such as Hamdan ATT, Nassar, Uncle Jo, Adibal Sahrul, Dedi Puja, and Mislam. Participants are gradually eliminated every week until the grand final night. The performance of participants is judged by the judges such as Iis Dahlia, Inul Daratista, Rita Sugiarto, Elvy Sukaesih, Saipul Jamil, Hetty Koes Endang, Beniqno, and Dewi Perssik, as well as by the viewers and fans via SMS voting. In each episode, participants with the lowest SMS vote amount will be eliminated. The overall winner of the competitions gets a cash prize of 150 million rupiah (roughly $10,000 USD) and a car. For the third season, the cash prize was upped to 250 million rupiahs (roughly $15,000 USD). In addition, the winner is entitled to a management contract with Stream Entertainment, as well as a recording opportunity to launch a single or an album through 3D Entertainment, a dangdut label.

The hosts are Ramzi, Irfan Hakim, Rina Nose, Andhika Pratama, and Gilang Dirga. The program premiered on Monday, February 3, 2014, for its first season, its second season on February 8, 2015, January 24, 2016, for its third season, and 22 January 2017 for its fourth season. After a break from 2017-2021, the fifth season premiered on Januari 27, 2022. D'Academy was nominated for the Panasonic Gobel Awards 2015 & Panasonic Gobel Awards 2016 for Best Talent Search & Reality Show category. In addition, D 'Academy also managed to be nominated in the Indonesian Television Awards program award for the category of Most Popular Prime-Time Non Drama Program. There have been five winners of the show to date: Lesti Kejora, Evi Anggraini, Muhammad Irsyad Basir, Fildan Rahayu and Serli Artika Sridevi.

== Format ==
=== Stages ===
There are 6 stages in the competition, those being:

- Stage 1- Audition
- Stage 2- Nomination Concert (season 1-4) Final audition concert (season 5-present)
- Stage 3- The wildcard Concert (season 1-4) The Fifty-fifty Concert (season 5-6)
- Stage 4- The wildcard Concert (season 5)
- Stage 5- The final concert
- Stage 6- The Grand Final

The auditions take place in large cities all around in Indonesia, including Bandung, Surabaya, Semarang, Medan, Makassar, Palembang, and finally, Jakarta. Those auditioning first must be approved by a panel of local artists, then by Indosiar producers, and finally by the main judges. Participants are given "golden tickets" to signify successful qualification to the subsequent round.

== Series overview ==
Season	Episodes	Originally released		Winner	Runner-up	Third place
Season	Episodes	First released	Last released	Winner	Runner-up	Third place
1	56	February 3, 2014	May 30, 2014	Lestiyani	Nur Aty[id]	Edfrans Angga
2	80	February 2, 2015	June 12, 2015	Evi Anggraini[id]	Danang Pradana Dieva[id]	Irwan Krisdiyanto[id]
3	80	January 24, 2016	May 27, 2016	Muhammad Irsyad Basir[id]	Weni Wahyuni[id]	Irsya Cendekiawan
4	81	January 16, 2017	May 19, 2017	Fildan Rahayu[id]	Putri Isnari[id]	Aulia[id]
5	83	July 18, 2022	December 16, 2022	Serli Artika Sridevi[id]	Eby Rizta	Ahmad Afan Khadafy
6	40	December 13, 2023	January 21, 2024	Hariyanto Tuna[id]	Novia Rianti	Putri Ramadhani[id]
7	97	June 9, 2025	December 26, 2025	Anastasya Febrianti Susilo	Achmad Valen Akbar [id]	Afriyani Mida Soleha
8	7 (as of June 30, 2026)	June 22, 2026	ongoing	TBA	TBA	TBA

=== Season 1 (2014) ===
The first season of D'Academy was won by Lestiyani (a.k.a Lesti Kejora), defeating Nur Aty [id] and Frans, who were previously in the top 3. The first season of D'Academy auditions was held in five cities: Medan, Makassar, Surabaya, Bandung, and Jakarta. Auditions were also held on buses in six cities: Cirebon, Surakarta, Purwokerto, Tasikmalaya, Serang, and Bogor. This season aired from February 3 to May 30, 2014.

D'Academy 1 Top 15 Finalists (with elimination date)
Lesti Kejora (Lestiyani)	Winner; June 6, 2014
Aty [id] (Nur Aty)	Runner Up; June 6, 2014
Edfrans Angga (Edfrans Angga Satria Jaya)	Third Place; May 23, 2014
Subro Alfarizi (Subro Alfarizi)	Top 4 May 9, 2014
Ikif Khawazima (Mariyatul Khiftiyah)	Top 5 May 2, 2014
Eka Pradona (Yanuar Eka Pradona)	Top 6 April 25, 2014
Glenn Rumbino (Glenn Sereby Rumbino)	Top 7 April 11, 2014
Febro Kisyanto (Febrohadi Kisyanto	Top 8 April 10, 2014
Deswa Suwandi (Dedy Suwandi)	Top 9 April 4, 2014
Eva Diarti (Eva Diarti Dinar)	Top 10; April 3, 2014
Ariyanto (Ariyanto)	Top 11; March 28, 2014
Zahdan Hasan (Zahdan Hasan)	Top 12; March 27, 2014
Rasya Jamil (Nurasya Jamil)	Top 13; March 26, 2014
Bonita Yolanda (Bonita Yolanda Auliasari)	Top 14; March 25, 2014
Adit Kemal (Budi Mulyadi)	Top 15; March 24, 2014

=== Season 2 (2015) ===
The second season of D'Academy was won by Evi Masamba [id], defeating Danang Pradana Dieva [id] and Irwan Krisdiyanto [id], who were previously in the top 3. The second season of D'Academy auditions was held in seven cities: Medan, Makassar, Surabaya, Semarang, Bandung, Palembang, and Jakarta. This season aired from February 8 to June 12, 2015.

D'Academy 2 Top 15 Finalists (with elimination date)
Evi Masamba [id] (Evi Anggraini)	Winner; June 12, 2015
Danang Pradana [id] (Danang Pradana Dieva)	Runner Up; May 22, 2015
Irwan Krisdiyanto [id] (Irwan Krisdiyanto)	Third Place; May 23, 2015
Reza Zakarya [id] (Reza Zakarya Mahdami)	Top 4 May 8, 2015
Ika Sugiyarti (Ika Sugiyarti)	Top 5 May 1, 2015
Ady Kasipahu (Ady Kasipahu)	Top 6 April 21, 2015
Ega Noviantika [id] (Ega Noviantika)	Top 7 April 18, 2015
Endah Purwaningsih (Endah Purwaningsih)	Top 8 April 16, 2015
Intan Putawa (Intan Nova Cristin Putawa)	Top 9 April 14, 2015
Rita Mauliyani (Mahrita Mauliyani)	Top 10; April 11, 2015
Titik Sanova (Titik Sanova)	Top 11; April 9, 2015
Tria Aprilia [id] (Tria Aprilia Wulandari)	Top 12; April 7, 2015
Ayu Kurnia (Sri Ayu Kurnia)	Top 13; April 4, 2015
RizkyRidho (Rizky Syafaruddin [id] & Ridho Syafaruddin [id])	Top 14; April 2, 2015
Albi Maududi (Muhammad Albi Maududi)	Top 15; March 31, 2015

=== Season 3 (2016) ===
The third season of D'Academy was won by Muhammad Irsyad Basir [id], defeating Weni Wahyuni [id] and Irsya, who were previously in the top 3. The third season of D'Academy auditions was held in seven cities: Medan, Makassar, Surabaya, Semarang, Bandung, Banjarmasin, and Jakarta. This season aired from January 24 to May 27, 2016.

D'Academy 3 Top 15 Finalists (with elimination date)
Ical Majene [id] (Muhammad Irsyad Basir)	Winner; May 27, 2016
Weni Wen [id] (Weni Wahyuni)	Runner Up; May 27, 2016
Irsya Cendekiawan (Irsya Cendekiawan)	Third Place; April 29, 2016
Rani Zamala [id] (Nurafni)	Top 4 April 22, 2016
Duo Alfin (Alfin Habib [id] & Alfin Khairi)	Top 5 April 15, 2016
Rafly Heriawan [id] (Muhammad Rafly Heriawan)	Top 6 April 5, 2016
Ismail Kadir (Ismail Kadir)	Top 7 April 2, 2016
Anggun Merdekawati (Anggun Merdekawati)	Top 8 March 31, 2016
Sherly Marlinda (Sherly Marlinda)	Top 9 March 29, 2016
Dila Asellole (Dila Frista Asellole)	Top 10; March 26, 2016
Anisya Cosmaningrum (Anisya Cosmaningrum)	Top 11; March 24, 2016
Arin Wulan (Arin Wulan Sari)	Top 12; March 22, 2016
Tasya Oktavika (Natasya Oktavika Duri)	Top 13; March 19, 2016
Anissa Forella (Anissa Forella)	Top 14; March 17, 2016
Sarah Rizkia (Sarah Rizkia Tunnisa)	Top 15; March 15, 2016

=== Season 4 (2017) ===
The fourth season of D'Academy was won by Fildan Rahayu [id], defeating Putri Isnari [id] and Aulia [id], who were previously in the victory concert and grand final. The fourth season of D'Academy auditions was held in seven cities: Medan, Makassar, Surabaya, Semarang, Bandung, Palembang, and Jakarta. This season aired from January 16 to May 19, 2017.

D'Academy 4 Top 15 Finalists (with elimination date)
Fildan Rahayu [id] (Fildan Rahayu)	Winner; May 19, 2017
Putri Isnari [id] (Putri Isnari)	Runner Up; May 19, 2017
Aulia [id] (Aulia)	Third Place; May 4, 2017
Teguh Saputra (Teguh Purwa Saputra)	Top 4 April 28, 2017
Arland Singh (Muhammad Dahlan)	Top 5 April 21, 2017
Firdaus Sanjaya (Firdaus Sanjaya)	Top 6 April 9, 2017
Raiga Danendra (Raiga Danendra)	Top 7 April 7, 2016
Muhammad Hafiz (Muhammad Hafiz)	Top 8 April 5, 2017
Sugeng Hidayaturrahman (Sugeng Hidayaturrahman)	Top 9 April 3, 2017
Azizah Hayrunisa (Azizah Ismi Hayrunisa)	Top 10; April 1, 2017
Aan (Muhammad Abdul Nabi)	Top 11; March 29, 2017
Poppy Widiarti (Poppy Widiarti Taubari)	Top 12; March 27, 2017
Ayu Anjani (Ayu Anjani)	Top 13; March 25, 2017
Nuriel Januario (Qolbi Nuril Huda)	Top 14; March 23, 2017
Rafi Fenderico (Rafi Fenderico)	Top 15; March 21, 2017

=== Season 5 (2022) ===
The third season of D'Academy was won by Serli Artika Sridevi [id], defeating Eby and Afan, who were previously in the victory concert and grand final. This season's auditions were held online due to the ongoing Covid-19 pandemic. Besides, this season is the first season of D'Academy after 4 years of being cancelled. This season aired from July 18 to December 16, 2022.

=== Season 6 (2023–2024) ===
The sixth season of D'Academy was won by Hariyanto Tuna [id], defeating Novia and Putri Ramadhani [id], who were previously in the victory concert and grand final. This season's auditions, participants can only audition online via. This season aired from December 13, 2023 to February 21, 2024.

=== Season 7 (2025) ===
The seventh season of D'Academy was won by Anastasya Febrianti Susilo (a.k.a Tasya Allesia), defeating Achmad Valen Akbar [id], and Afriyani, who were previously in the victory concert and grand final. This season's auditions can be done in 2 via, online and offline. The seventh season of D'Academy offline auditions was held in six cities: Jakarta, Makassar, Sidoarjo, Prabumulih, Samarinda, and Cianjur. This season aired from July 9 to December 27, 2025. This season is the season with the longest episodes in the previous 6 seasons.

=== Season 8 (2026) ===
This season's auditions can be done in 2 via, online and offline. The eighth season of D'Academy auditions was held in eight cities: Jakarta, Makassar, Surabaya, Balikpapan, Medan, Cirebon, Sidenreng Rappang, and Musi Banyuasin. This season will air on June 22, 2026.

== See also ==
- Indonesian dangdut contest
- Indonesian Idol
- Indonesian Dangdut League
- Rising Star Indonesia Dangdut
