= Senandung Cinta Lilis =

- Genre: Romantic comedy
- Created by: Ferry Fernandez
- Screenplay by: Tisa T. S.
- Directed by: Cuk FK
- Starring: Lesti Kejora; Rizky Billar; Fadlan Muhammad; Diana Pungky; Adinda Halona; Levian Billar; Lilis Suganda; Putty Noor; Rahmet Ababil; Kris Anjar; Agung Saga; Guntur Nugraha
- Theme music composer: Adibal
- Opening theme: "Ada Yang Punya" by Lesti
- Ending theme: "Ada Yang Punya" by Lesti
- Composer: Diddi AGP
- Country of origin: Indonesia
- Original language: Indonesian
- No. of seasons: 1
- No. of episodes: 45

Production
- Executive producers: Choky Andriano; Hanif
- Producer: Ferry Fernandez
- Cinematography: Ipank Page
- Editors: James Haryo; M. Rizky Mubarok; Erwan Kristyanto Noval
- Camera setup: Multi-camera
- Running time: 75 minutes
- Production company: Bargawa Films

Original release
- Network: ANTV
- Release: 10 December 2025 – 23 January 2026

Senandung Cinta Lilis is an Indonesian television series produced by Bargawa Films which aired on 10 December 2025 to 23 January 2026 on ANTV. Serial ini disutradarai It starring Lesti Kejora, Rizky Billar, and Fadlan Muhammad.

== Plot ==
Lilis is a simple girl with a golden voice. However, this talent is only known to her best friend, Neneng. Her father, Deden, strongly opposed the singing world due to her past, forcing Lilis to give up her dream.

Lilis chose to help out at the family food stall, delivering orders, while harboring her ambition to become a singer. However, fate had other plans when she crossed paths with Leo, a handsome young man who continued to pursue auditions but whose career never left the stage. Their first meeting was filled with resentment, setting the stage for a conflict-ridden relationship.

Amidst her busy schedule, Lilis often secretly assisted Neneng as a "shadow singer" from behind the stage. However, an incident exposed all her lies, and Lilis had to bear the blame for a mistake that wasn't entirely hers.

It was then that fate brought her back to Leo. This second encounter sparked another argument, further complicating their relationship. However, the seeds of feelings slowly grew beneath the feud. Their journey is full of dynamics, from personal conflicts, challenges to achieving their dreams, to efforts to overcome circumstances.

Can Lilis and Leo overcome all the obstacles to achieve their dreams? And will their relationship, always marked by arguments, ultimately lead to love?

== Cast ==
- Lesti Kejora as Lilis Irawan
- Rizky Billar as Leo di Kaprio
- Fadlan Muhammad as Deden
- Diana Pungky as Sarah Amalia
- Adinda Halona as Neneng Siti
- Elgi Purnama as Cecep
- Anyun Cadel as Ali Tampan
- Andie Rivai as Pak RT
- Boim Imoet as Togar
- Daniel Leo as Dimas
- Tita Hananto as Demplon
- Levian Billar as Jalu
- Neyrissa Arviana as Bella
- Lilis Suganda as Rina
- Angga Wijaya as Adam
- Putty Noor as Lastri
- Rahmet Ababil as Ujang
- Kris Anjar as Kris
- Agung Saga as Tarjo
- Guntur Nugraha as Herman

== Production ==
=== Casting ===
Lesti Kejora was confirmed to play Lilis. This series is the third collaboration between Billar and Kejora.
