= Happy Asmara =

Indonesian singer-songwriter (born 1999)

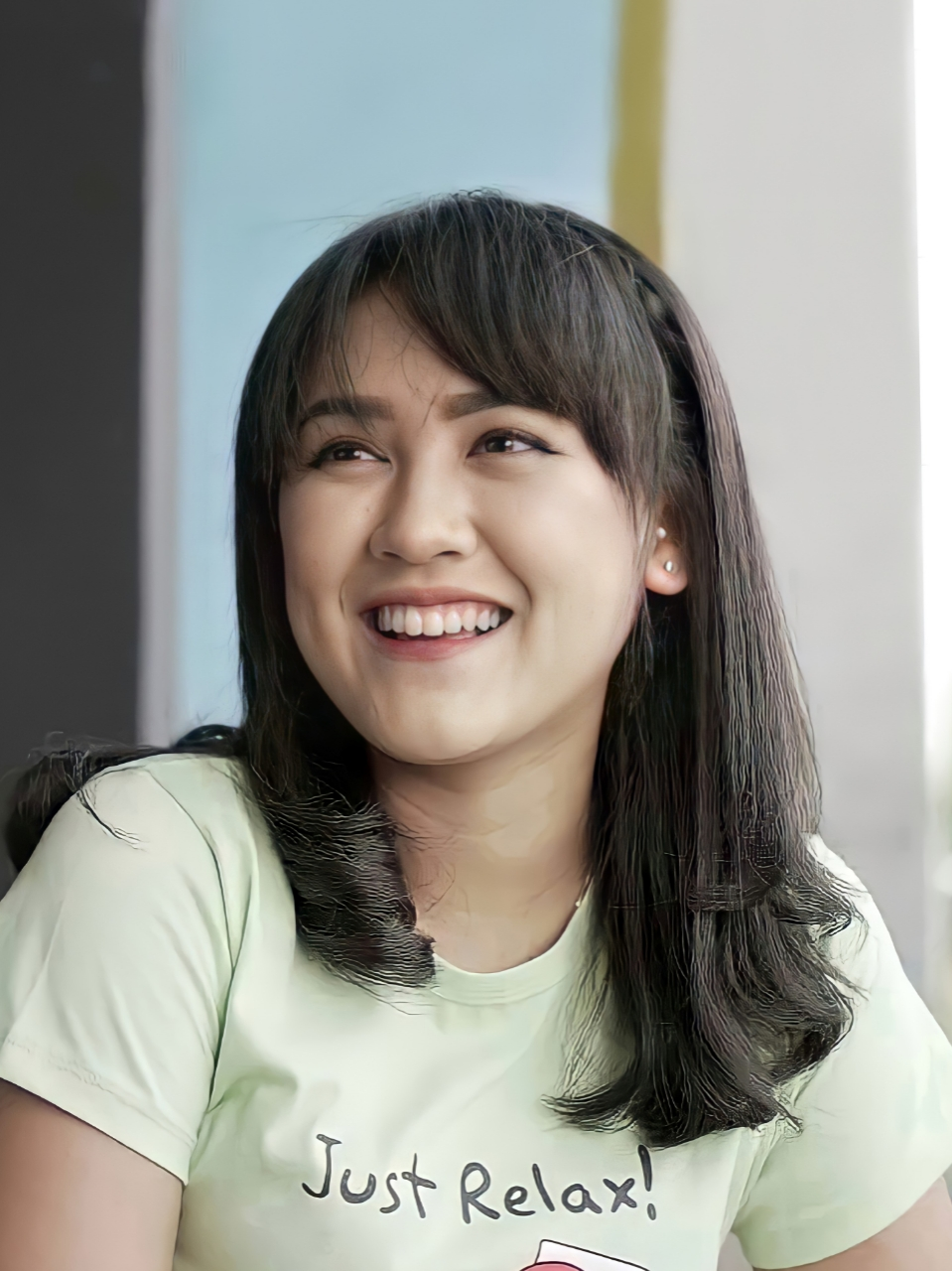
- Happy Asmara in 2019
- Born: Heppy Rismanda Hendranata; July 10, 1999 (age 27); Kediri, Indonesia
- Other name: Happy Rism
- Education: Open University Malang
- Occupations: Singer-songwriter; presenter; businessperson
- Musical career
- Genres: Dangdut; koplo; pop-koplo; jandhut; campursari; pop
- Instruments: Vocal; guitar; ukulele
- Label: GTA Label (2018–present)

Heppy Rismanda Hendranata (Javanese: ꦲꦼꦥ꧀ꦥꦾꦫꦶꦱ꧀ꦩꦤ꧀ꦢꦲꦼꦤ꧀ꦢꦿꦤꦠ; born July 10, 1999), better known by the stage name Happy Asmara is an Indonesian singer-songwriter, presenter, and businessperson from Kediri, East Java. Based herself in Javanese music, her name gained wider public attention after the release of the second single of her own production titled "Tak Ikhlasno" which has gained immense popularity in the Java region, specifically East Java. In the year of the release of "Tak Ikhlasno", Happy through the record label released the recycled single "Dalan Liyane" which also gained great popularity and at least became a change in her career. In popular culture, "Tak Ikhlasno" and "Dalan Liyane" have been considered the beginnings of great recognition.

== Early life and education ==
Happy Asmara was born in Ringinrejo, Kediri and grew up in the Ringinrejo District area. She is the eldest of four children from a Javanese-Minahasan father, Hendro Siswantoro, and a Javanese mother, Dwi Yuslianti. Happy has three younger siblings; the oldest is Riang Cahya Fortuna and the youngest is Alexio Bertrand Alvaro, while her second younger brother is a person with autism and has died from tetanus. Happy's last name is a patronymic name given by her parents, which was adapted from her father's first name.

Happy has completed her junior high school education from SMP Negeri 2 Kras, then she continued and has completed her senior high school education from SMA Negeri 1 Kandat in Kediri Regency, East Java. Happy had pursued a Bachelor of Education (S.Pd.) degree in Primary School Teacher Education (PGSD) from the Open University (UPBJJ-UT) Malang in Kediri City, but due to her busy career she finally chose to stop until an unspecified time.

== Career ==
=== 2009, 2013 – 2016: Early career ===
In 2009, when Happy was between the ages of 8 and 10, she started her career by being selected as a model for a local children's magazine in East Java. As time went by, Happy's talent in singing began to show, she had been training her vocals since she was in junior high school. Happy began her musical career by appearing from stage to stage, starting from local festivals, filling weddings, to appearing as a sinden in wayang kulit events.

In 2013, Happy began signing a contract with a local record company and a few years later she began joining several dangdut orchestras at once in East Java. Happy released her debut single on January 1, 2014 with a live recording of the title track "Sayang 4". Throughout her career, Happy worked as a vocalist for a local indie band in Kediri, at the same time she was also a rocker singer with a punk fashion style.

=== 2016 – 2017: Dangdut Academy 4 Surabaya audition ===
While still a high school student in 2016, Happy was supported by her parents to audition for the fourth season of the popular dangdut singing talent search D'Academy at BK3S Tenggilis Mejoyo in Surabaya, the audition was held on November 7 2016 and was broadcast delayed by Indosiar on January 18, 2017. In the audition assessment round, Happy sang several lyrics from the song "Sayang" which was popularized by Via Vallen, Nassar Sungkar, Dewi Persik, and Iis Dahlia became the main panel of judges assessing her performance. At the end of the audition, Happy managed to get a golden ticket which was given directly by Dewi Persik as the main panel of judges. After the audition round was over, she was considered to have resigned and was also declared to have failed to advance to the next round. This happened because she did not answer the phone call from the organizers informing her that she had been selected to compete in Jakarta for fear of fraud.

== Personal life ==
In 2023, Happy publicly began a relationship with Gilga Sahid, a fellow singer-songwriter from Madiun, East Java. After a relatively brief period of courtship, they officially married on June 24, 2024. The wedding ceremony was held in a semi-private setting at the Trending #1 Building in Kandat, Kediri, East Java, and was attended by close family members and relatives.

== Discography ==
=== Album ===
- Samudra Record Live (2019)
- Pingin Sayang (2020)
- Happy Asmara Terbaik (2020)
- Bikin Happy (2022)

=== Single ===
- "Salah" (2019)
- "Tak Ikhlasno" (2019)
- "Balik Kanan Wae" (2019)
- "Ojo Geton" (2019)
- "Kebal Kelaran" (2020)
- "Sampun Lilo" (2020)
- "Bahagiamu" (2020)
- "Iri Bilang Boss" (2020)
- "Wes Tatas" (2020)
- "Purik" (2020)
- "Ojo Dadi Pecundang" (2021)
- "Tak Warahi Carane" (2021)
- "Siji Wektu" (2021)
- "Cukup" (2022)
- "Tanpo Aku (Sing Ati-Ati)" (2022)
- "Suwun Lorone" (2022)

== Filmography ==
=== Film ===
Year	Title	Role	Production	Channel
2019	KKN di Desa Penari (Ballet)	Widya	HA Pictures	YouTube

=== Web series ===
Year	Title	Role	Production	Channel
2021–present	Srintil Mencari Cinta	Srintil	HA Pictures	YouTube

=== Music Video Model ===
- Tegar Soekamthos – "Aku Rapopo" (2020)
- Denny Caknan – "Helleh" (2022)
