= A. Rafiq =

Jakarta-based dangdut artist

A.Rafiq
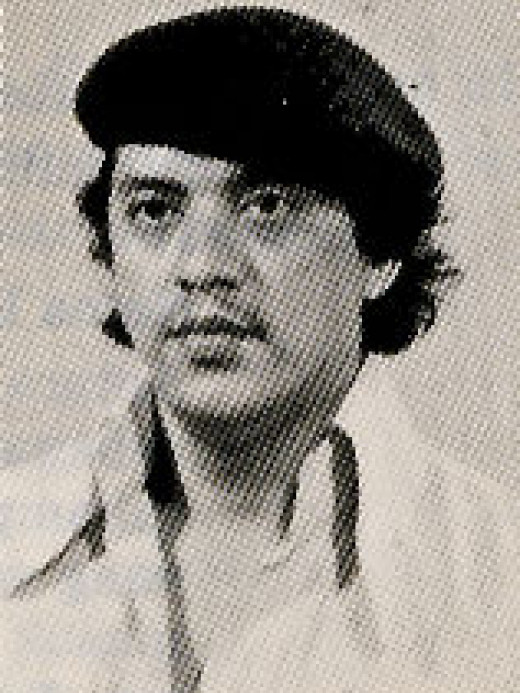

Background information
- Born: Ahmad Rafiq; March 5, 1946; Semarang, Indonesia
- Died: January 19, 2013 (age 64) Jakarta, Indonesia
- Genres: Dangdut
- Occupation(s): Musician, actor
- Instrument: Vocals
- Years active: 1960–2012
- Labels: HP Records; Musica Studios

H. Ahmad Rafiq (5 March 1946 – 19 January 2013) was a prominent Jakarta-based dangdut artist. He was active in the Indonesian music industry from the 1970s onwards. He launched his first single, "Pandangan Pertama" ("First Sight") in 1978. The single was a huge hit and propelled his career in the Indonesian '70s dangdut scene. Rafiq, along with Rhoma Irama and Elvy Sukaesih were the three most popular dangdut singer in the '70s. Rafiq is well known for his Elvis-inspired stage costume and hip-gyrating movements.

The hit "Pengalaman Pertama" enjoyed a second popularity in 2002, when it was remade by one of the most popular Indonesian singers Chrisye in his album Dekade. In 2007, Pengalaman Pertama was again remade by popular Indonesian rock band Slank in the original motion picture soundtrack of Indonesian movie Get Married.

Rafiq died on January 19, 2013, from complications of Diabetes.

== Discography ==
- Pengalaman Pertama
- Milikku
- Pandangan Pertama
- Cantik
