= Rizky Billar =

Indonesian actor

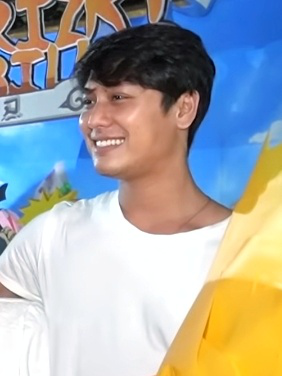
- Billar in 2021
- Born: Muhammad Rizky; 12 July 1995 (age 30); Medan, North Sumatra, Indonesia
- Occupations: Actor; Model; Host; Singer
- Years active: 2014–present
- Known for: Anak Jalanan; Jodoh Wasiat Bapak Babak 2
- Spouse: Lesti (m. 2021)
- Musical career
- Genres: Pop
- Instrument: Vocal
- Labels: AFE Records (2020–2021); Trinity Optima Production (2021–2022)

Muhammad Rizky or known as Rizky Billar (born 12 July 1995) is an Indonesian actor and model. Billar is best known for him portrayal of Dendi in Anak Jalanan on RCTI and Iqbal in Jodoh Wasiat Bapak Babak 2 on ANTV.

== Career ==
Billar started his career in modeling, although initially he dreamed of becoming a soccer athlete and had attended training at KONI Medan. His dream ran aground because he was suffering from typhus symptoms.

Fate was more in favor of making him an artist, after he entered and won first place in the Aneka Yess! contest in 2011. This victory opened the opportunity to enter the world of entertainment.

== Early life ==
Born to a father named Daniel Eddy and Mrs. Rosmala Dewi, Billar, who is of Minangkabau descent, is the last of 6 children. Billar has Minang blood from his parents who come from Bukittinggi, West Sumatra.

== Personal life ==
Billar was officially engaged to the singer Lesti after the proposal ceremony, which was held on 13 June 2021 at Gedong Putih, Lembang, Bandung. The ceremony followed the Sundanese custom.

Billar officially married Lesti after holding the marriage contract and consent on 19 August 2021, which took place at the Intercontinental Hotel Pondok Indah, South Jakarta.

The couple had a son named Muhammad Leslar Al-Fatih Billar on 26 December 2021.

== Domestic Violence Controversy ==
Billar was reported by Lesti to the South Jakarta Metro Police for domestic violence, which occurred on 28 September 2022 at around 01.51 Western Indonesia Time and 09.47 Western Indonesia Time. In her report, Lesti revealed that Billar responded violently after he was caught cheating. In the early hours of the morning, when Lesti asked to be sent back to her parents' house because of the incident, Billar got so emotional that he pushed Lesti down onto the bed and strangled her. This happened repeatedly. Another incident occurred the next morning, when Billar tried to pull Lesti towards the bathroom. He also slammed his wife to the floor repeatedly so that her right hand, left, neck and body were injured. Due to Billar's actions, Lesti submitted a report to the South Jakarta Metro Police in the evening around 22.00 Western Indonesia Time.

For his actions, he was officially dismissed as one of the presenters of the talent search show D'Academy which aired on Indosiar. This announcement was made by other presenters, namely Ramzi, Irfan Hakim, Gilang Dirga, Ruben Onsu, Jirayut and Tiyara Ramadhani in the broadcast live the program on 4 October 2022. This is in accordance with the Indonesian Broadcasting Commission appeal, which prohibits perpetrators of domestic violence from appearing on television or radio. Not only that, the award for the Gorgeous Dad category he won from the Infotainment Awards 2022 event which aired on SCTV and was given right on the day the incident occurred on 29 September 2022 was also revoked a week later.

Billar was officially named a suspect by Polda Metro Jaya on 12 October 2022 and was detained the day after. On 15 October 2022, Billar was officially released after 1 day in detention because Lesti withdrew the lawsuit.

== Filmography ==
=== Films ===
Key
†	Denotes films that have not yet been released

Year	Title	Role	Notes
2015	Miss Call	Jefry	
2021	Gas Kuy	Hardi	
2022	Ashiap Man	Nico	

=== Web series ===
Year	Title	Role	Notes
2018	Koma	Rizky	
2020	Nikah Muda	Rama	

=== Television ===
Year	Title	Role	Notes
2015	Rajawali	Rizky	
2016	Anak Jalanan	Dendi	
2016	Jinny Oh Jinny Datang Lagi	Riko	
2017	Pangeran 2	Evan	
2017	Apa Kata Dunia	Boy	
2018	Ada Dua Cinta	Bimo	
2019	Istri-Istri Akhir Zaman	Iwan	
2019	Topeng Kaca	Arya Mahendra	
2019	Jangan Panggil Gue Pak Haji	Faisal	
2020	Cinta Karena Cinta	Ryan	
2020	3xtraOrdinary Love	Host	
2020	Tasbih	Host	
2020	Pop Academy	Host	
2020	Semarak	Host	
2020	Karnaval	Host	
2020	OTW (Obrolan Terupdate Wadidaw)	Host	
2020–2021	Liga Dangdut Indonesia	Host	
2021	Cinta Nikita	Tirta	
2021	Kulepas Dengan Ikhlas	Reza	
2021	Sahurnya Pesbukers	Host	
2021–2022	Jodoh Wasiat Bapak Babak 2	Iqbal	
2021–2022	Cinta Abadi Leslar: Tetaplah Setia Bersamaku	Host	
2022	D'Academy 5	Host	
2024	Aku Mencintaimu Karena Allah	Raja	
2025–2026	Senandung Cinta Lilis	Leo di Kaprio	

=== Television film ===
- Seribu Kisah: Air Terjun Pemisah Jodoh (2015)
- Lovepedia: Love Game (2016)
- Cintaku Buat Mas Bro (2016)
- Rahasia Cinta Pelangi (2017)
- Cowok Ganteng Pejuang Dhuha (2017)
- Sate Ayam Bumbu Cinta (2018)
- Cinta Jangan Kasih Kendor (2018)
- I Love You To The Moon And Back (2018)
- Cinta Jangan Kasih Kendor (2018)
- Cintaku Pendek Tapi Kece (2018) as Kevin
- Ada Cinta Dibalik Gula (2018)
- Karena Netijen Ku Lari ke Desa (2018)
- Jodohku Berat Sama Dipikul, Ringan Sama Dijinjing (2018)
- Crazy Not Rich Mentog Di Warteg (2019)
- Berakit Ke Hulu Berenang Ke Hatimu (2019)
- Energi Cinta Cinderella Matre (2019)
- Resep Cinta Kaki Lima Rasa Bintang Lima (2019)

=== Music videos ===
Year	Title	Singer(s)
2020	Ragu-ragu	Nanasheme
2020	Kulepas dengan Ikhlas	Lesti
2022	Lentera	Lesti
2022	Pesta	Betrand Peto Putra Onsu
2022	Terhukum Rindu	Andika Mahesa & Putra Siregar

== Discography ==
=== Single ===
Year	Title	Lyrics	Label
2020	Melihatmu Bahagia	Tengku Shafick	AFE Records
2020	Kini Hanya Tentangmu	Mario Kacang	AFE Records
2021	Pemimpinmu	Aldi Nada Permana	Trinity Optima Production

=== As the featured singer ===
Year	Title	Lyrics	Label
2021	Salah Benar (with 3 Composer)	Tengku Shafick, Mario Kacang, Bemby Noor	AFE Records
2021	Takdir Cinta (with Lesti)	Enda, Oncy	3D Entertainment
