= RANS Entertainment =

Indonesian media and entertainment company

- Type: Public
- Traded as: IDX: RANS
- ISIN: ID1000214406
- Industry: Mass media, entertainment
- Founded: 27 December 2015; 10 years ago
- Founders: Raffi Ahmad; Nagita Slavina
- Headquarters: South Tangerang, Indonesia
- Key people: Nagita Slavina (president director)
- Revenue: IDR 353.4 billion (2025)
- Operating income: 75,553,214,952 rupiah (2025)
- Net income: IDR 56.7 billion (2025)
- Total assets: 461,034,721,642 rupiah (2025)
- Number of employees: 109 (2026)
- Website: www.ransentertainment.co.id

RANS Entertainment (officially PT Rans Entertainmen Indonesia Tbk) is an Indonesian media and entertainment company founded in 2015 by the married couple Raffi Ahmad and Nagita Slavina. The name RANS combines the initials of Raffi Ahmad (RA) and Nagita Slavina (NS). The company began as a YouTube channel about the couple's family life. It has since expanded into television, animation and web series production, a music channel, live events and family attractions, football, basketball and esports teams, and investments in technology start-ups.

In 2021 the company announced a partnership with Emtek Group, and in 2022 it said it planned to hold an initial public offering (IPO). It listed on the Indonesia Stock Exchange on 10 July 2026, raising IDR 429.25 billion and leaving Raffi Ahmad with about 63% of its shares. Its revenue was IDR 353.4 billion in 2025, down from IDR 410.5 billion in 2024. The company's prospectus lists dependence on the founders and their family as a main business risk.

== History ==
=== Founding and early years ===
RANS Entertainment was founded on 27 December 2015. Its name combines the initials of Raffi Ahmad (RA) and Nagita Slavina (NS). The couple chose YouTube as their first platform because Nagita Slavina felt freer to express herself there than on television.

Raffi Ahmad has said that he started the channel to record moments with his family. Its first videos were about facial makeup. He later saw advertising revenue from YouTube's AdSense program as a source of income.

=== Partnerships and expansion ===
On 26 October 2021, RANS announced a partnership with Emtek Group, an Indonesian media group, and said that Kaesang Pangarep had been appointed a commissioner, a supervisory board position in Indonesian companies.

In January 2022, Raffi Ahmad told CNBC Indonesia that the company was profitable and planned to hold an IPO. He said RANS no longer relied only on YouTube and had other business lines, such as managing sports fields in Pantai Indah Kapuk. In February 2022, Nailul Huda, an economic observer at the Institute for Development of Economics and Finance, said that RANS was not ready for an IPO that year because it still relied on the public profile of its owners.

In February 2023, RANS said it was becoming an accelerator company that would take on partner businesses, starting with four food and beverage ventures. Raffi Ahmad said the company was still waiting for the right moment for an IPO. In February 2025, the company moved its head office from the Kemang area of South Jakarta to the RANS Office Building in BSD City, South Tangerang.

=== Initial public offering ===
RANS Entertainment listed on the Indonesia Stock Exchange on 10 July 2026 as PT Rans Entertainmen Indonesia Tbk (the suffix Tbk marks a publicly listed company), with the ticker RANS. Its shares were placed on the exchange's Development Board. The company sold 2.525 billion new shares, about 20% of its enlarged share capital, at IDR 170 per share, the top of its price range, and raised IDR 429.25 billion. At the top of the range, the offer implied a market value of about IDR 2.14 trillion. On the first day of trading the shares opened at IDR 228, 34% above the offer price.

Before the offering, Raffi Ahmad held 78.68% of the company; afterwards he held 62.93%. The second-largest shareholder was PT Indonesia Entertainmen Grup, with 7.23%. That company is a subsidiary of the broadcaster Surya Citra Media. Raffi Ahmad stated that he would remain the controlling shareholder and beneficial owner for at least three years after the listing. At the listing, Nagita Slavina was the company's president director.

RANS said it would use the proceeds mainly for the operating costs of concerts in several cities (37.61%), for buying a 51% stake in PT Rans Kosmetika Indonesia, owner of the cosmetics brand Slavina (19.80%), and for building a permanent version of Cipungland, its children's play-and-learning attraction (18.64%). It also set aside 8.15% for a joint venture with the technology company Feedloop to develop artificial intelligence products and about 7% to repay a loan from Bank Negara Indonesia in full. The rest was to go to subsidiaries as capital.

== Business activities ==
In its 2026 prospectus, RANS described its business in four segments: producing and distributing media content; managing intellectual property (IP) and commercial activations; events and experiential entertainment; and supporting businesses and strategic investments. It said its social media ecosystem had more than 155 million followers. Raffi Ahmad has described the company's IP as including characters based on his sons Rafathar and Rayyanza, consumer product lines and the Cipungland attraction.

=== Online content ===
As of August 2026, the main YouTube channel, RANS Entertainment, had about 26.7 million subscribers and ranked tenth among Indonesian channels in a weekly Databoks listing.

On 16 August 2018, RANS launched RANS Music, a separate YouTube channel for music. As of August 2023, it had about 972,000 subscribers.

On 18 June 2020, RANS began a 30-hour live broadcast with 22 segments and guests including Ari Lasso, Gading Marten, Nikita Mirzani, Olla Ramlan and Rizky Febian. More than 4 million viewers watched it. It earned the channel two records from the Indonesian World Records Museum (MURI): one for the family-event live broadcast with the most viewers, and one for the longest family-event live broadcast on YouTube and Facebook.

=== Television, animation and web series ===
RANS has made television shows with Indonesian broadcasters. With Trans7 it made Siyap Bos (2020). With ANTV it made The Next Influencer (2021), The Andarans (2022) and Koplo Superstar (2022). With SCTV it made Gembira Waktu Siang (2022), House of Mama Gigi (2023) and Turnamen Olahraga Selebriti Indonesia (2023–2024).

RANS has also produced animated series. Si Aa, based on the daily life of the couple's son Rafathar Malik Ahmad with his family and several fictional characters, premiered on 23 May 2020 and was also broadcast on ANTV to mark Rafathar's fifth birthday. Later animated series include Kapten Phoenix and Lorong Waktu Si Aa (both 2022) and Cipung Abubu (2023).

In 2019, RANS released the web series Mimpiku Jadi Nyata (My Dream Becomes Real), starring the top five contestants of the third season of Indonesian Idol Junior, on 30 September. RANS later released the web series Cinta untuk Dimas and Bucin Story (both 2021).

=== Sports ===
RANS entered esports in 2020, when its RANS Esports division formed a PUBG team named RANS Glory in July. By late 2021 it had also expanded into football and basketball through the clubs RANS Cilegon F.C. and RANS PIK Basketball.

In March 2021, Raffi Ahmad and the businessman Rudy Salim acquired the football club Cilegon United, which became RANS Cilegon F.C. The club lost the Liga 2 final 2–1 to Persis Solo and was promoted to Liga 1. On 30 May 2022, a congress of the Football Association of Indonesia (PSSI) approved its renaming as RANS Nusantara F.C. Club operations director Darius Sinathrya said the new name was meant to attract supporters from across Indonesia, not only from Cilegon.

RANS PIK Basketball was launched in January 2022 to play in the Indonesian Basketball League (IBL). On 14 October 2023 it was renamed RANS Simba Bogor, after moving its home base to Bogor and gaining a sponsorship from the brand Simba.

=== Events and attractions ===
RANS organises live events. Its prospectus said it had held more than 20 events in the previous four years, among them RANS Carnival, a festival-style event held in several Indonesian cities. RANS has also staged Cipungland, a children's play-and-learning attraction. In 2025 it held Cipungland as temporary events in Bekasi and Karawang, which drew 42,298 visitors in total, and it said it would use IPO proceeds to build a permanent version. In August 2026, RANS announced an expanded partnership with the food manufacturer Mayora Indah, a partner since 2019, covering RANS Carnival and Cipungland events, including a Cipungland event in Lombok.

In November 2021, RANS announced plans to open a theme park in Pantai Indah Kapuk in 2022. Groundbreaking for a zoo in the area, RANS Carnaval City Zoo, took place on 17 December 2021; the zoo was planned to cover 2.6 hectares. In May 2026, Investortrust reported that RANS was developing a zoo business in the Pantai Indah Kapuk 2 area.

=== Investments ===
In mid-2021, RANS Ventures, the couple's venture capital unit, co-led a US$2.6 million seed funding round (about IDR 37 billion) for VCGamers, an Indonesian social-commerce platform for gamers, together with the venture capital firm Beenext. In February 2022, RANS announced an investment in the audio content app Noice. It put IDR 35.75 billion into Noice's owner, Mahaka Radio Integra, for the app's development.

In March 2022, RANS and VCGamers announced RANSVerse, a blockchain-based metaverse project. Virtual land and other items in it were to be sold as non-fungible tokens.

== Revenue and audience ==
A 2019 compilation by Tempo's data and analysis center, based on estimates from the statistics website Social Blade, ranked RANS Entertainment second among Indonesian YouTubers by estimated income, behind Atta Halilintar, at between IDR 448 million and IDR 7.1 billion a month. Figures for the following year, cited in the textbook Kewirausahaan Perubahan Zaman (Entrepreneurship in Changing Times), ranked the channel fourth in Indonesia by subscribers, with possible monthly earnings of up to IDR 7.9 billion.

A 2020 study by Ega Maulana and colleagues found that subscribers' loyalty to the channel was closely related to their satisfaction with its videos and only weakly related to the company's image. The textbook says that internet users are drawn to content about celebrities' children, such as the daily life of Raffi and Nagita's son Rafathar.

The IPO prospectus reported revenue of IDR 437.8 billion in 2023, IDR 410.5 billion in 2024 and IDR 353.4 billion in 2025, and net profit of IDR 97.1 billion in 2024 and IDR 56.7 billion in 2025. The 13.9% fall in revenue in 2025 came mainly from declines of 51.6% in brand ambassador and talent management revenue and 12.7% in sales of IP-based products. The prospectus lists dependence on Raffi Ahmad, Nagita Slavina and their family as a main risk. Management said that Raffi Ahmad's work as a brand ambassador accounted for 14% of revenue in 2025, down from 24% in 2023.
