= Peace and Safe Islamic Party =

Indonesian political party

Peace and Safe Islamic Party Partai Islam Damai Aman
- Abbreviation: Idaman
- Chairman: Rhoma Irama
- Secretary-General: Kuswanto
- Founded: 14 October 2015
- Dissolved: 12 May 2018
- Merged into: PAN
- Headquarters: Jakarta
- Ideology: Pancasila; Islamic democracy Social democracy Islamic modernism
- Political position: Centre
- National affiliation: Just and Prosperous Indonesia Coalition (2018–2019)

Website
- https://www.instagram.com/partai_islam_damai_aman?igsh=MXVueTFxNXp5cG5zcA== (Instagram)

Peace and Safe Islamic Party (Indonesian: Partai Islam Damai Aman, lit. 'Peaceful and Safe Islamic Party'), abbreviated as Idaman (Indonesian for "desired"), was an Islam-based political party in Indonesia. The party was founded by Muslim dangdut artist Rhoma Irama that served as the only party chairman.

The party was declared on 14 October 2015 in a large-scale concert, with Rhoma himself announced the party principles by singing some of his songs. The party espoused moderate Islamic politics and aimed to dispel Islamophobia by projecting Islam as a peaceful and safe religion.

Idaman Party attempt to participate in 2019 Indonesian general election was failed after its registration was declined by the General Elections Commission (KPU) and its initial attempt to appeal to the General Election Supervisory Agency (Bawaslu) was defeated. The party attempted their second appeal to the State Administrative Court, and was defeated as well.

After Idaman Party exhausted all possible appeal methods and failed to overturn the rejection, Rhoma declared the party merged into the National Mandate Party (PAN) on 12 May 2018. The merge was dubbed as a "coalition agreement" with PAN and Rhoma remained Idaman Party chairman, despite no further arrangement known on the continuity of the Idaman Party institution.
