= Tasya Allesia =

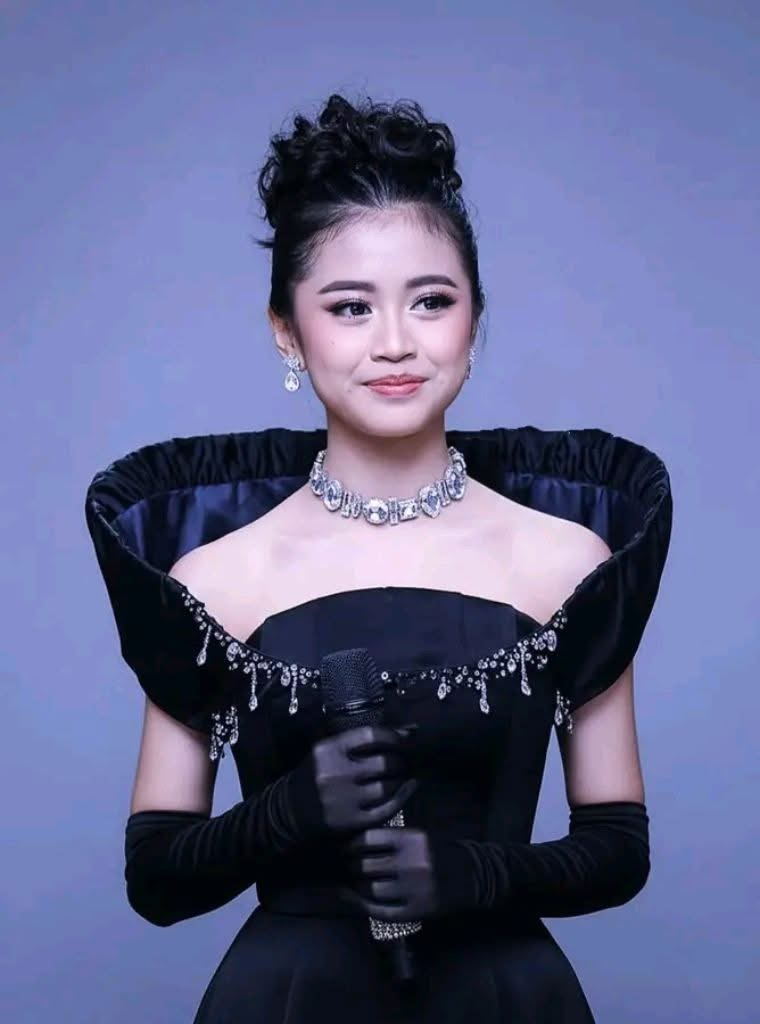
- Born: Anastasya Febrianti Susilo; February 20, 2010 (age 16)
- Musical career
- Genres: Dangdut; Pop
- Instrument: Vocal
- Years active: 2025–Now
- Labels: 3D Entertainment; Stream Entertainment

Anastasya Febrianti Susilo (Born: February 20, 2010), (Note: Tasya clarified her birth date as 20 February during a TikTok livestream. A recording was uploaded by a fan account. Indosiar also posted a birthday greeting on 20 February via their official Instagram account.) known professionally as Tasya Allesia or Tasya DA7, is an Indonesian Singer and Television personalities. She first gained public recognition as a child singer after appearing on the talent competition show Idola Cilik. She later achieved widespread national prominence in 2025 as the champion of Dangdut Academy (season 7). Tasya made her professional recording debut in January 2026 with her coronation single, "Teman Jadi Nyaman". Known for her vocal versatility, she often blends traditional dangdut elements with contemporary pop and R&B styles

== Discography ==
=== Singel ===
Year	Singel	Writer	Label	Ref
2026	Teman Jadi Nyaman	Adibal Sahrul; WinRosa	3D Entertainment	
2026	Ramadan Penuh Berkah (with Sridevi DA5, Eby DA5, Afan DA5, Top10 DA7)	Aditya Ilman Akbar	Indosiar; 3D Entertainment	

== Filmography ==
=== Television ===
Year	Title	Role	Notes	Ref
2022	Idol Cilik (Season 6)	Contestant		
2025	Dangdut Academy (Season 7)	Contestant	Winner	
2026	Di balik Rahasia Keberadaan Ayahku	Naura		

== Awards and nominations ==
Award Ceremony	Year	Category	Nominee(s)/Work(s)	Result	Ref
Jupiter Music Awards	2026	Hottest Trending Female Rookie	Tasya	Nominated	
Indonesia Dangdut Awards	2026	Most Popular Rookie Female Solo Dangdut Singer	Tasya DA7	Nominated	
Indomusik Awards	2026	Best Dangdut & Koplo Song Selected by Music Fans	Teman Jadi Nyaman - Tasya DA7	Nominated	
