= Nurul Qomar =

Indonesian politician (1960–2025)

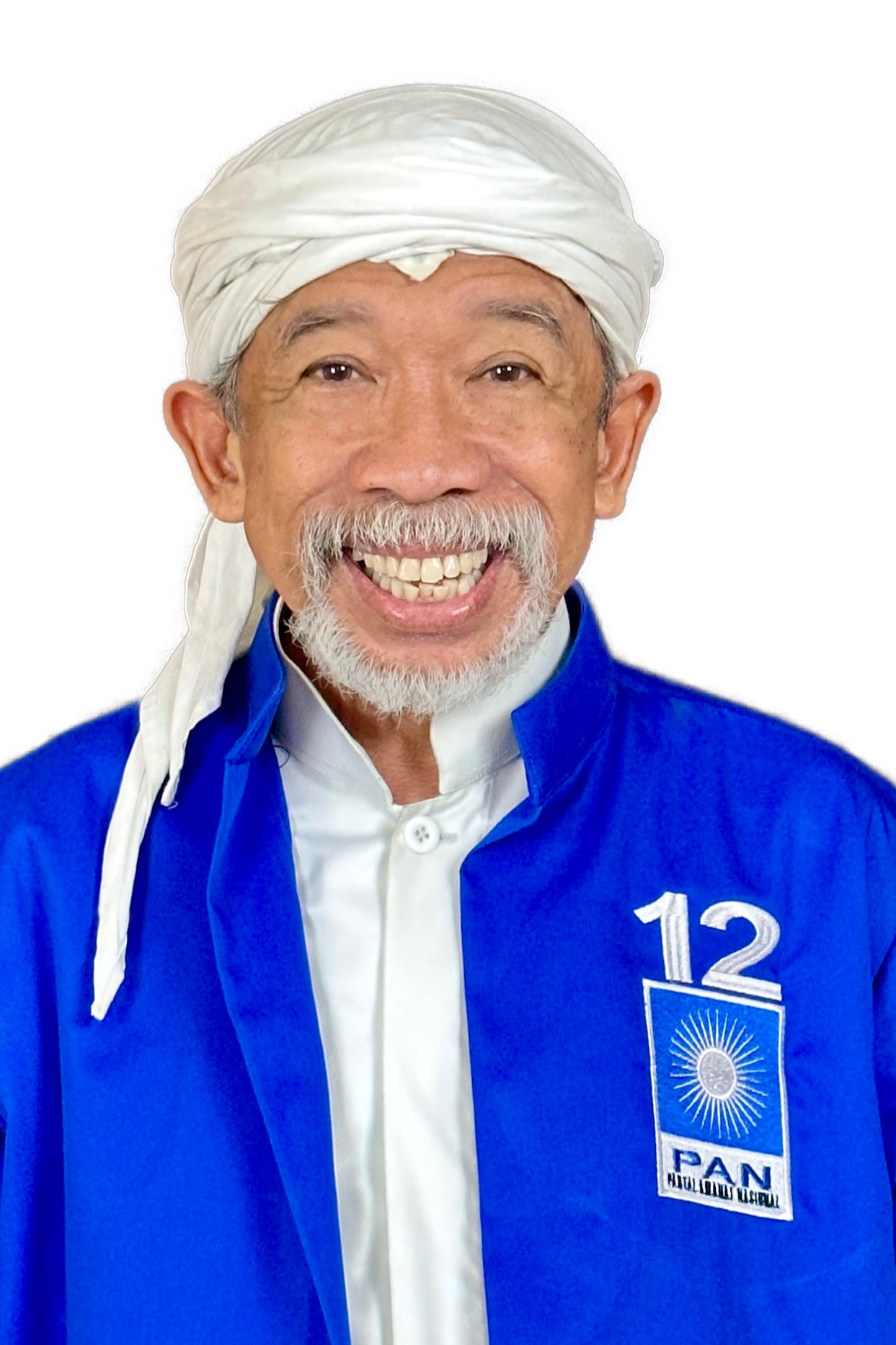
- Qomar in 2023

Member of the House of Representatives of Indonesia
- In office 1 October 2004 – 30 September 2014
- Constituency: West Java VII (2004–2009); West Java VIII (2009–2014)

Personal details
- Born: 11 March 1960 Jakarta, Indonesia
- Died: 8 January 2025 (aged 64) Tangerang, Indonesia
- Party: Democratic (2004–2018); NasDem (2018–2023); PAN (2023–2025)
- Education: Krisnadwipayana University
- Occupation: Actor, comedian, politician

Nurul Qomar (11 March 1960 – 8 January 2025), or better known by his stage name Abah Qomar, Komar, or Qomar, was an Indonesian politician, actor and comedian of Sundanese descent who once served as a Member of the Indonesian House Of Representatives for two periods from 2004 to 2014. Together with Derry, Eman, and Ginanjar, they formed the comedy group Empat Sekawan which known through the sitcom Lika-Liku Laki-Laki.

== Filmography ==
=== Movies ===
- Kawin Ganteng
- Lika-Liku Laki-Laki
- Saras 008
- Asmara Banyak Canda
- Penghuni Surga
- Samson dan Dahlia
- Ayu Anak Depok City
- Para Pencari Tuhan
- Fatih di Kampung Jawara

== Death ==
Qomar died on Wednesday, January 8, 2025, at the Tangerang District General Hospital while undergoing treatment for colon cancer which had spread to the liver and pancreas. Even though he was declared cured and free from colon cancer, the disease attacked again and spread until it reached stage 4D.

== Personal life ==
Nurul Qomar was born in Jakarta on March 11 1960 to Achmad Yusri and Siti Choridah. He is the first of seven children. His grandfather's extended family lived in Cirebon, West Java. His biological mother comes from Sindang Village, Indramayu, while his biological father comes from Ciekek Village, Pandeglang, Banten.

Qomar, who was raised by TOMTAM GROUP and Empat Sekawan, Comedian groups of Indonesia, and served as Member of the House of Representatives of Indonesia for 2 periods from 2009 to 2014. He then decided to move to Cirebon Regency.

Since February 9 2017, Qomar has served as rector of Muhadi Setiabudi University for the 2017–2021 period. However, he resigned on November 14 2017 on the grounds that he wanted to run in the 2018 Cirebon Regency regional elections.
