= Nagita Slavina =

Indonesian actress, presenter, singer and businesswoman

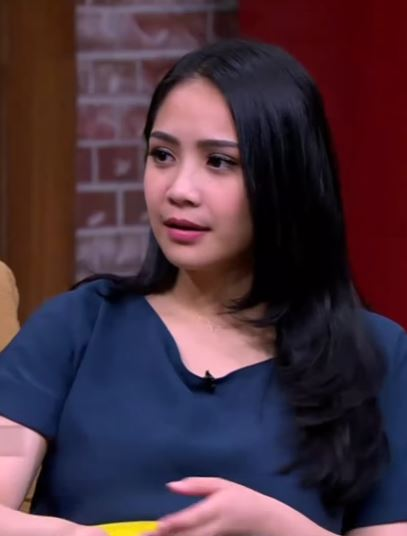
- Nagita Slavina on Ini Talkshow
- Born: Nagita Slavina Mariana Tengker; 17 February 1988 (age 38); Jakarta, Indonesia
- Occupations: Actress, television presenter, singer, producer, businesswoman
- Years active: 2000–present
- Spouse: Raffi Ahmad (m. 2014)
- Children: Rafathar Malik Ahmad; Rayyanza Malik Ahmad; Lily

Nagita Slavina Mariana Tengker (born 17 February 1988) is an Indonesian actress, television presenter, singer, producer and businesswoman. She has appeared in Indonesian television series and films and has released music. Together with her husband, Raffi Ahmad, she co-founded RANS Entertainment, an entertainment and digital-media company.

== Career ==
Nagita began her career as an advertising model in 2000 before moving into television acting. She appeared in the television series Di Sini Ada Setan in 2003 and subsequently took roles in feature films, including Di Sini Ada Setan the Movie (2004) and Dealova (2005).

Her later acting credits include Rafathar (2017), The Secret: Suster Ngesot Urban Legend (2018), Roh Fasik (2019) and Ashiap Man (2022). She has also worked in film production, including as an executive producer on Rafathar.

Nagita has also worked with Frame Ritz, a production house co-founded by her mother, Rieta Amilia Beta. Her work in the company included production responsibilities alongside her acting career.

=== Music ===
In addition to acting, Nagita has released music. In 2019, she recorded a cover of "Dengan Menyebut Nama Allah", a song composed by Dwiki Dharmawan and previously performed by Novia Kolopaking. The accompanying music video was released on 24 May 2019.

== Business career ==
Nagita co-founded RANS Entertainment with Raffi Ahmad. The venture began with digital content and expanded into entertainment-related businesses, including music, sports and lifestyle ventures.

By July 2026, Nagita was serving as president director of PT Rans Entertainmen Indonesia Tbk. The company completed an initial public offering on the Indonesia Stock Exchange on 10 July 2026, raising approximately Rp429.25 billion.

== Personal life ==
Nagita married Raffi Ahmad on 17 October 2014. Their wedding was broadcast live on Trans TV for several hours. The Indonesian Broadcasting Commission (Komisi Penyiaran Indonesia, KPI) subsequently issued a written warning to the broadcaster, describing the transmission as excessively long and without public benefit.

Nagita gave birth to her first son, Rafathar Malik Ahmad, on 15 August 2015. She and Raffi later had a second son, Rayyanza Malik Ahmad. In 2024, the couple adopted a daughter whom they publicly referred to as Lily.

== See also ==
- RANS Nusantara F.C.
- RANS Simba Bogor
