= Rhoma Irama =

Indonesian dangdut singer (born 1946)

Raden Haji Rhoma Irama
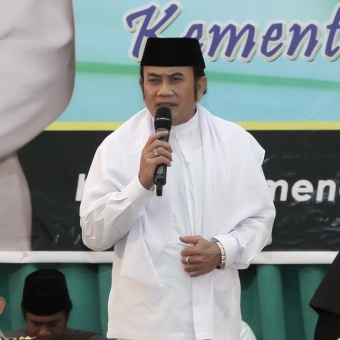
- Rhoma Irama in Palembang, 2015

Member of People's Representative Council
- In office 1 October 1997 – 1 October 1999
- President: Suharto; B.J. Habibie
- Parliamentary group: F-KP
- Constituency: Jakarta

Personal details
- Born: Oma Irama; 11 December 1946 (age 79) Tasikmalaya, West Java, Indonesia
- Party: Golkar
- Other political affiliations: Idaman (2015–2018)
- Spouses: Veronica Agustina (divorced); Ricca Rachim; Angel Lelga (divorced); Marwah Ali
- Children: 5
- Occupation: Singer; songwriter; guitarist; actor; entrepreneur
- Musical career
- Also known as: Raja Dangdut (King of Dangdut)
- Genre: Dangdut
- Instruments: Vocals; guitar
- Years active: 1958–present
- Labels: HP Records; Musica Studios; Universal Indonesia
- Website: rhomairama.info

Raden Haji Oma Irama, better known as Rhoma Irama (born 11 December 1946), is an Indonesian dangdut singer, songwriter, guitarist and former politician of Sundanese descent.

Starting in the late 1960s, he began his musical career as Rhoma Irama as a part of the pop band Orkes Melayu Purnama, pioneering several dangdut music elements. He then formed his band, Soneta Group, achieving multitudes of musical successes with groundbreaking dangdut style that incorporates Western, Malay, and Bollywood influences.

From the late 1970s, he began transforming into more Islamic-oriented style, commanding the religiously pious popular music culture. During the height of his stardom in the 1970s, he was dubbed "Raja Dangdut" ("the King of Dangdut") with his Soneta Group. He has also built his career in the film industry.

He has been active as well in the political arena, with a history of joining campaigns for the Islamic United Development Party (PPP) during the New Order era. In 2015, Irama founded Peace and Safe Islamic Party and served as the party chairman until 2018, when he decided to merge the party into the National Mandate Party.

== Early life ==
Irama's parents assigned the priyayi noble title of Raden at birth to follow his Sundanese father, Raden Burdah Anggawirya, and mother, R. Hj. Tuti Juariah.

== Career ==
=== 1960s: Pre-Soneta ===
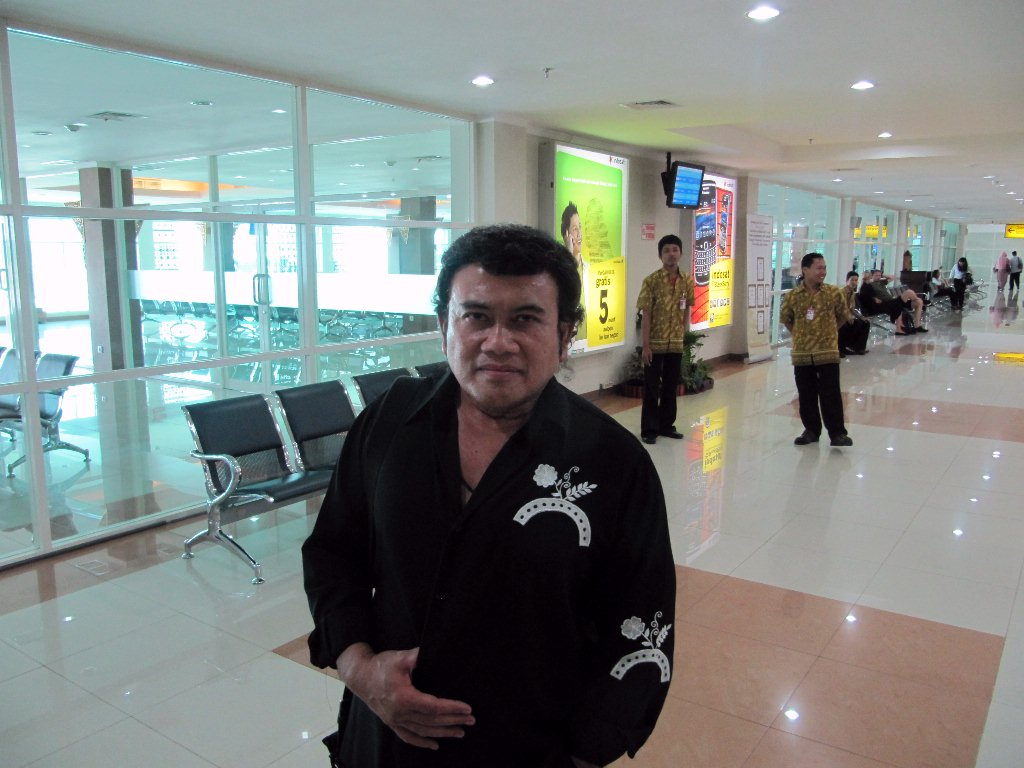
Rhoma Irama in musician suit, 2010

Oma was an baritone, with a "warm, husky, and strong" timbre, unlike many of the popular tenor singers of the 1960s. He modeled his singing technique on American folk singer Bob Dylan, American blues guitarist Elmore James, and American pop and country singer Roy Orbison.

Oma Irama's first bands were known as Tornado and Gayhand and covered Western rock and roll music of Paul Anka, Andy Williams, and The Beatles.

In the late 1960s Oma Irama, sang Javanese and also some Indonesian pop music. In 1968 he joined the group Orkes Melayu Purnama in 1968. This group pioneered elements of the dangdut style within Orkes Melayu music – the drum was changed to double drum, the electric guitar's role was expanded, and the suling, or bamboo flute, adopted a style reminiscent of Bollywood music. He also recorded Indonesian pop music during this period with the Zaenal Combo and Galaksi, while the album Ingkar Janji was recorded in 1969 with Orkes Melayu Chandraleka.

=== Early 1970s: Soneta Group ===
Once Oma broke off from recording with the Purnama Group, he formed Orkes Melayu Soneta (taken from Indonesian word of sonnet), which became the first dangdut group in 1970. The subtitle, the sound of Moslems was added in 1973.

The group featured Oma Irama and Elvy Sukaesih as singers, both solo, and duets. Their first album, Volume 01, Begadang ("Stay up all night"), released in 1973, featured four songs by Oma Irama, three by Elvy, and three duets. The song featured a topless Oma Irama wearing tight trousers and holding an electric guitar. His choice of pose showed the influence on his music of Western bands, influences which also found their way into his music – Orkes Melayu was in his opinion was too soft, too acoustic, too polite, and unable to compete against the power and energy of rock music, and so the music was electrified, with keyboard, two electric guitars, electric bass, as well as the traditional suling and gendang. He has stated that he took his guitar style from Ritchie Blackmore of Deep Purple. In addition to Western and Malay influences, Hindi composers were credited for some of the band's songs.

The Begadang album ranked No. 11 on Rolling Stone Indonesia's "150 Greatest Indonesian Albums of All Time" list. Furthermore, the main single "Begadang" reached at number 24 on the magazine's "150 Greatest Indonesian Songs of All Time" list.

His 1973 hit "Terajana", one of the best-known dangdut songs of all time, was the first to use the newly coined, and arguably derogatory, term dangdut, distinguishing the Javanese Orkes Melayu music, heavily influenced by Indian Bollywood records, henceforth dangdut, from the established Orkes Melayu, associated with North Sumatran Malays.

Once Soneta was established in the early 1970s, Oma changed his name to Rhoma and went on a decade-long run of successful hit records and films, all of which starred Rhoma playing himself while performing all of his hits. He wrote the classics "Kereta Malam" (night train) and "Kuda Lumping" which were sung by Elvy Sukaesih.

Performing live, he adopted many of the props of stadium rock, including large audiences, powerful sound systems, complex sets, fireworks, flashing lights, and smoke machines. He is also notable with the use of some notable musical instruments including various models of Steinberger guitars. This particular guitar was shown off in his posters, leaflets, movies, and pin-ups.

=== Late 1970s onward: Islamic pious music ===
Following his 1975 hajj, he took the name Rhoma Irama, which is an abbreviation of "Raden Haji Oma Irama" (Raden is an aristocracy title for Javanese and Sundanese cultures). Following this pilgrimage, he took on a more explicit Islamic moral tone, adopting Islamic dress, shorter hairstyles, and ejecting band members who consumed alcohol or had extra-marital sex. He also resolved that his music should instruct, and not merely entertain, a form of devotion waged through music. Themes in his music included extra-marital sex, government corruption, drugs, and gambling. The song "Haram" for instance, warns against both drugs and gambling, while the song "Keramat" asserts the instructions in Islam to honor mothers.

His 1982 movie Perjuangan dan Doa (Struggle and Prayer) was described as the world's first Islamic rock musical movie.

== Politics ==
=== During Suharto-era ===
Rhoma Irama campaigned for the Islamic party PPP from 1977 to 1982, and as a result he was banned from state television and radio by the Suharto regime, which was at that time enforcing separation of religion and state, and some of his songs were also banned from sale. The ban was lifted in 1988, and with Suharto himself moving towards Islam in the 1990s, dangdut became of the establishment.

=== Indonesian presidential election, 2014 ===
At the end of 2012, Rhoma Irama, stated his intention to contest the 2014 presidential election. The Wasiat Ulama association and the Indonesia Malay Musicians Association (PAMMI) have endorsed him.

By December 2013 Rhoma Irama is proposed as one of the Partai Kebangkitan Bangsa (PKB) presidential candidate along with Jusuf Kalla and Mahfud MD.

=== Peace and Safe Islamic Party ===
On 14 October 2015, Rhoma declared the Peace and Safe Islamic Party (Indonesian: Partai Islam Damai Aman), abbreviated as Idaman. Idaman Party's attempt to participate in the 2019 Indonesian general election failed after its registration was declined by the General Elections Commission (KPU) and its initial attempt to appeal to the General Election Supervisory Agency (Bawaslu) was defeated. The party attempted their second appeal to the State Administrative Court, and was defeated as well. After Idaman Party exhausted all possible appeal methods and failed to overturn the rejection, Rhoma declared the party merged to the National Mandate Party (PAN) on 12 May 2018.

== Controversies ==
=== Regarding religious issues ===
In 2000s Rhoma was known to be a vocal critic of moral vice. His criticism often targeted fellow dangdut artist Inul Daratista over her dance style.

In 2003, neighbors followed by journalists caught both Rhoma Irama and Angel Lelga, an actress, in the latter's apartment at midnight. Rhoma and Angel first stated that they were discussing religion. After several revisions including Rhoma's picking up movie scripts, Angel confirmed that Rhoma had married her on siri ground (unregistered at the official record but permissible by Sharia) and later divorced her on the same day.

=== Allegation of racism and bigotry ===
During the 2012 Jakarta gubernatorial election, Rhoma Irama was videotaped giving a political speech in a West Jakarta mosque. Rhoma Irama warned his audience against voting for candidate pair Joko Widodo and Basuki Cahaya Purnama because according to him, the former had Christian parents and the latter is Chinese and Christian. Some of his statements were: Muslims would see their reputation sink if they elected non-Muslims, calling people by their SARA (acronym for ethnic, religion, race) characteristics is justified when defending pribumi's interest, Joko Widodo is just a step for Basuki and Chinese to assume power. In his closing words, he alleged "ethnic Malay would face subjugation by Chinese in Jakarta as they did in Singapore when it gained independence from Malaysia should Basuki be allowed to govern" (Singapore did not gain independence from Malaysia but was expelled from Federation of Malaysia).

In Indonesia, attacking a person's race or religion in a political campaign is punishable by fines and prison time. Further added to the controversy was the fact that campaigning in a place of worship violates the law. On 6 August, the Election Observer Commission (Panwaslu) presided by Ramdansyah summoned him to begin the investigation. The initial investigation ended with Rhoma Irama shedding tears in front of journalists saying "to Joko Widodo and Basuki Purnama, I love them all" but insisted he did nothing wrong. Subsequent investigation saw Rhoma Irama and Fauzi Bowo (incumbent governor) denying that Rhoma was campaigning or working as Fauzi Bowo's campaigner despite Rhoma's own statement in June 2012 that he and his family had become one and Rhoma's appearance in Fauzi Bowo's official campaign video.

Rhoma was eventually cleared of all charges by Panwaslu. However Ramdansyah was relieved from his post after another investigation into his neutrality concluded he was unfairly siding with Fauzi Bowo re-election team. Later, Rhoma met face to face with Joko Widodo in an episode of Indonesia Lawyers Club show albeit through teleconference medium. He refused to apologize to Joko for falsely stating to his audience about the religion of Joko's parents.

== Discography ==
=== Pre-Soneta ===
- Djangan Kau Marah
- Di Rumah Sadja
- Di Dalam Bemo
- Biarkan Aku Pergi
- Anak Pertama
- Djenggo
- In Dan Dip
- Pemburu

=== With OM Soneta ===
- Dangdut
- Surat Terakhir
- Berbulan Madu
- Gelandangan
- Joget
- Janda Kembang
- Tiada Lagi

=== With Soneta Group (Volume Series) ===
- Soneta Vol-1 Begadang (1973)
- Soneta Vol-2 Penasaran (1974)
- Soneta Vol-3 Rupiah (1975)
- Soneta Vol-4 Darah Muda (1975)
- Soneta Vol-5 Musik (1976)
- Soneta Vol-6 135.000.000 (1977)
- Soneta Vol-7 Santai (1977)
- Soneta Vol-8 Hak Azazi (1978)
- Soneta Vol-9 Begadang 2 (1979)
- Soneta Vol-10 Sahabat (1980)
- Soneta Vol-11 Indonesia (1980)
- Soneta Vol-12 Renungan Dalam Nada (1981)
- Soneta Vol-13 Emansipasi Wanita (1983)
- Soneta Vol-14 Judi (1988)
- Soneta Vol-15 Gali Lobang Tutup Lobang (1989)
- Soneta Vol-16 Bujangan (1994)

=== Movie soundtracks and compilations ===
- Oma Irama Penasaran
- Gitar Tua Oma Irama
- Darah Muda
- Begadang
- Berkelana I
- Berkelana II
- Raja Dangdut
- Camelia
- Cinta Segitiga
- Perjuangan dan Doa
- Melodi Cinta
- Badai di Awal Bahagia
- Sebuah Pengorbanan
- Cinta Kembar
- Pengabdian
- Satria Bergitar
- Kemilau Cinta di Langit Jingga
- Menggapai Matahari I
- Menggapai Matahari II
- Nada-Nada Rindu
- Bunga Desa
- Jaka Swara
- Nada dan Dakwah
- Tabir Biru
- Dawai 2 Asmara

=== Rhoma Irama solo albums ===
- Pemilu (1982)
- Lebaran (1984)
- Persaingan (1986)
- Haji (1988)
- Modern (1989)
- Haram (1990)
- Salawat Nabi (1991)
- Kehilangan Tongkat (1993)
- Rana Duka (1994)
- Stress (1995)
- Baca (1995)
- Viva Dangdut 1996
- Mirasantika (1997)
- Gulali (1998)
- The Rough Guide to the Music of Indonesia (2000)
- Euforia (2000)
- Syahdu (2001)
- Asmara (2003)
- Jana Jana (2008)
- Azza (2010)

=== Singles ===
- Pemilu - N.V (2019)
- Pemilu Damai (2023)
- Topeng (2023) - author: Maskit
- SmaraRindu (2023) - Dewa Budjana X Rhoma Irama, feat. Virgil Donati, Shadu Rasjidi
- BALIN (New Version) (AHHA RECORDS, 2025) - Atta Halilintar X Rhoma Irama X Aurel
- Senyum (Media Music Proaktif, 2025)

== Filmography ==
- Oma Irama Penasaran (1976)
- Gitar Tua Oma Irama (1977)
- Darah Muda (1977)
- Rhoma Irama Berkelana I (1978)
- Rhoma Irama Berkelana II (1978)
- Begadang (1978)
- Raja Dangdut (1978)
- Cinta Segitiga (1979)
- Camelia (1979)
- Perjuangan dan Doa (1980)
- Melody Cinta Rhoma Irama (1980)
- Badai di Awal Bahagia (1981)
- Sebuah Pengorbanan (1982)
- Satria Bergitar (1984)
- Pengabdian (1984)
- Kemilau Cinta di Langit Jingga (1985)
- Menggapai Matahari I (1986)
- Menggapai Matahari II (1986)
- Nada-nada Rindu (1987)
- Bunga Desa (1988)
- Jaka Swara (1990)
- Nada dan Dakwah (1991)
- Tabir Biru (1992)
- Dawai 2 Asmara (2010)
- Sajadah Ka'bah (2011)

== Awards and nominations ==
Year	Award	Category	Recipients	Result
1992	Indonesian Film Festival	Citra Award for Best Leading Actor	Nada dan Dakwah	Nominated
