= Jirayut =

- อาฟีซัน เจ๊ะดือราแม
- Born: Afisan Jehdueramae; 24 February 2001 (age 25); Su-ngai Padi, Narathiwat, Thailand
- Occupations: Singer; actor; model; television presenter
- Years active: 2018–present
- Known for: Music; film; variety show
- Musical career
- Genres: Dangdut
- Instrument: Vocals
- Years active: 2018—present
- Labels: Maksi; 3D Entertainment; 3D

Afisan Jehdueramae (Thai: อาฟีซัน เจ๊ะดือราแม; born 24 February 2001), better known by the mononym Jirayut is a dangdut singer, presenter and actor from Thailand whose career is in Indonesia.

== Early life and career ==
Jirayut was born with the name Afisan Jehdeuramae on 24 February 2001, in Su-ngai Padi District, Narathiwat, Thailand. Jirayut is the third of four children of Sman Jehdueramae and Amalina Hayati. He has an older sister named Amilia Jehdueramae, an older brother named Arfan Jehdueramae, and a younger sister named Anisa Jehdueramae. Jirayut is of Thai Malay ethnicity; he has Malay ancestry from his mother's line, and Thai from his father's line. He was born into a family that adheres to Islam.

Jirayut started his career in the Indonesian entertainment industry by becoming a representative of Thailand in the event Dangdut competition "D'Academy Asia season 4" which was broadcast on Indosiar in 2018. He first took part in this event when he won a singing competition in his village, and then his friend asked him to audition. Three days later, when he was going to audition in the city, which took 40 minutes, there was a problem with not having a vehicle. He had given up on going to the audition, but then his teacher helped him and took him to the audition venue. At that time, he was still studying at Bangbang Okute School, grade 3. After a month, Jirayut was declared to have passed the audition and went to Indonesia with five other Thai representatives. In the talent search event, he was eliminated in the top ten round because he received the lowest score from the judges. One day after he was eliminated from the top 10 on December 16, 2018, he was trusted to be the host of the event alongside other senior presenters. He was again trusted to host the show in the following seasons. In the following years, he was trusted to host several television shows, including Liga Dangdut Indonesia and Indonesian Television Awards.

Based on his career in Indonesia, Jirayut released his first single six months after the competition. The song is entitled "Jambret Cinta" created by drummer and music producer, Posan Tobing which was released on June 29, 2019, at the Pop Star Concert which was broadcast live on Indosiar. Apart from his career as a singer and presenter, Jirayut also developed his career in acting, starting with starring in several television films Pintu Berkah which were broadcast on Indosiar. In 2022, Jirayut joined artist management Stream Entertainment and record label 3D Entertainment. His single "Sejak Pandangan Pertama" which was released on October 17, 2022, is the first song released through the label.

== Artistry ==
=== Stage Name ===
The name "Jirayut" was created as his stage name in Indonesia. He said that when competing, the producers asked him to look for a stage name that had a Thai feel. The name "Jirayut" was inspired by an actor from Thailand named James Jirayu. Jirayut said he chose this name because it gave the impression of being funny, unique and not easily forgotten.

== Personal life ==
Jirayut masters three languages, Thai, Malay, and Indonesian. When competing he was accompanied by a translator when speaking on stage, after leaving and starting his career in Indonesia, he took an Indonesian language course for two months. Based in Indonesia, Jirayut resides in Jakarta. He lives in a two-story house with his four work teams. Jirayut has a passion for volleyball. When he has free time, he often plays volleyball with his colleagues in Indonesia.

== Discography ==
=== Single ===
As lead artist
Title	Year	Album	Ref.
"Jambret Cinta"	2019	Singel non-album	
"Tiada Tara" (Original & Thai version –"Rak Maimi Ti Priab")	2020	Singel non-album	
"Cintai Aku Karena Allah"	2021	Singel non-album	
"Goyang Gultik"	2021	Singel non-album	
"Rindu Luar Biasa" (solo & duet version with Eva Yolanda)	2021	Singel non-album	
"Sejak Pandangan Pertama"	2022	Singel non-album	
"Terluka Cinta"	2023	Singel non-album	
"Kulaab Khao" ("Mawar Putih" Thai version)	2023	Singel non-album	

== Filmography ==
=== Music video ===
- "Pesta" — Betrand Peto Putra Onsu (2022)

=== Film ===
Year	Title	Role	Note
2024	Jagad Anyar: Kematian yang Dirahasikan	Jirayut	Short Film
2024	Kang Mak (Remake of Pee Mak)		

=== Television series ===
Year	Title	Role	Note
2023	Magic 5	Dafa Henandra	

=== FTV ===
Year	Title	Role	Note
2019	Pintu Berkah	Jirayut	Episode: "Gadis Pemilik Kos yang Rajin Bersedekah Menjadi Pengusaha Sukses Hotel Syariah"
2019	Pintu Berkah	Rino	Episode: "Penjual Tahu Miskin yang Dihina, Kini Jadi Pengusaha Muda"
2019	Pintu Berkah	Ivan	Episode: "Cita Mulia Bocah Pengamen Jalanan untuk Menyembuhkan Ibunya"
2019	Pintu Berkah	Syahril	Episode: "Tukang Servis AC yang Bermimpi untuk Bisa Kuliah"
2019	Pintu Berkah	Syamsul	Episode: "Jalan Berliku Petani Pala yang Sukses Jadi PNS"
2020	Pintu Berkah	Syahril/Aziz	Episode: "Martabak yang Tabah Menuai Sukses di Usia Senja"
2020	Pintu Berkah	Arif	Episode: "Penjual Martabak yang Tabah Menuai Sukses di Usia Senja"
2020	Pintu Berkah	Irfan	Episode: "Pemuda Saleh Penjual Air Zam-zam yang Rajin Beramal"

=== Web Series ===
Year	Title	Role	Note
2023–24	Rumah Kosong	Herself	
2024	Kost Putri	Herself	Season 2, episode 3

== Awards and nominations ==
Year	Awards	Category	Nomination	Result
2019	Social Media Award	Favorite Host	"Jirayut"	Won
2019	Indonesian Dangdut Award	Most Popular New Dangdut Singers	"Jirayut"	Won
2020	Konser Sosial Media LIDA	Favorite Host	"Jirayut"	Nominated
2020	Anugerah Dangdut Indonesia	The Newest Dangdut Singer Most in My Heart	"Jirayut"	Won
2020	Anugerah Dangdut Indonesia	The Dangdut song that is most in my heart	"Tiada Tara"	Nominated
2020	Kiss Award	Most Popular Male Dangdut Singer	"Jirayut"	Nominated
2020	Kiss Award	Kissed Host	"Jirayut"	Nominated
2020	Kiss Award	TikTok Celebrities Kissed	"Jirayut"	Won
2021	HOT Award	Most Popular Male Dangdut Singer	"Tiada Tara"	Won
2021	HOT Award	Most Requested Songs	"Tiada Tara – Jirayut"	Won
2021	Konser Sosial Media LIDA	Favorite Host	"Jirayut"	Nominated
2021	Konser Sosial Media LIDA	Favorite Most Exciting Moment	Jirayut Hairstyle	Won
2021	Anugerah Dangdut Indonesia	The Male Dangdut Singer Most in My Heart	"Jirayut"	Nominated
2022	Kiss Awards	Kissed Male Dangdut Singer	"Jirayut"	Nominated
2022	Kiss Awards	Kissed Host	"Jirayut"	Nominated
2022	Kiss Awards	TikTok Celebrities Kissed	"Jirayut"	Won
2022	Indonesian Dangdut Award	Male Solo Dangdut Singer	"Jirayut"	Nominated
2022	D'Academy 5 Sosial Media Awards	Favorite Host	"Jirayut"	Won
2022	D'Academy 5 Sosial Media Awards	Favorite Most Exciting Moment	"Shake Darderdor with Rai"	Nominated
2023	ANTV Rame Awards	Favorite Pesbukers Guest Star	"Jirayut"	Won
