= Dewi Perssik =

Indonesian dangdut singer

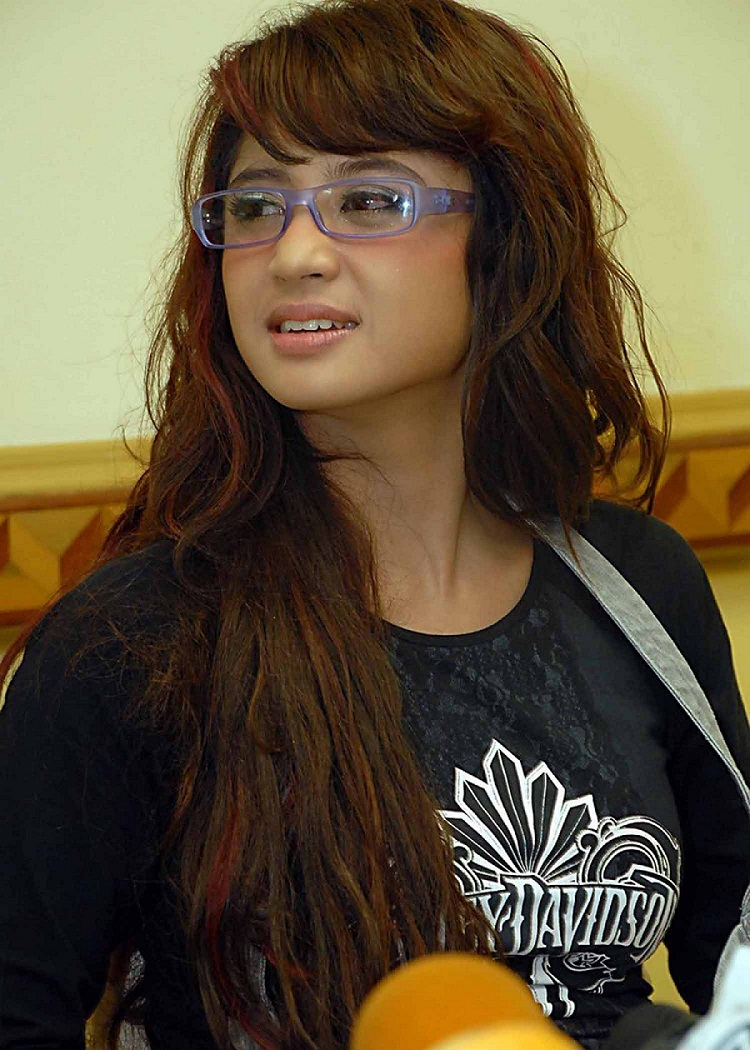
- Perssik in 2008

Background information
- Born: Dewi Muria Agung
- Genre: Dangdut
- Occupations: Singer; actress
- Years active: 2003–present

Dewi Muria Agung, better known by her stage name Dewi Perssik (also spelled Dewi Persik) and nicknamed Depe after her monogram, is an Indonesian dangdut singer.

== Biography ==
Persik is the youngest of four children born to Mochammad Aidil and Sri Muna. She also has some Chinese ancestry. She later became a dangdut singer, becoming noticed for her "saw move" (Indonesian: Goyang Gergaji), so named because it resembles the back and forth movement of a saw. She was given the stage name Persik after the Indonesian word for peach, which is thought to bring good luck in Chinese culture. She is also known by the nickname "Depe".

During 2008, she raised controversy for her "vulgar" movements and outfits while performing onstage and was banned from performing in Tangerang and Bandung; Bandung mayor Dada Rosada stated that her "sexually provocative" movements did not qualify as art or culture. After she apologized and promised to keep her performances tamer, Minister for Youth and Sports Affairs Adhyaksa Dault said that she should be respected for "admitting her mistake".

Two years later, she raised controversy after several nude pictures of her were released online. The Islamic Defenders Front (FPI) reported her to the Jakarta police, alleging that the pictures violated the 2008 Bill against Pornography and Pornoaction. The FPI also made plans to throw rotten eggs at her house, and a spokesman compared her to Japanese pornographic actress Maria Ozawa. Persik later admitted that the pictures were of her, and that she often posed in the nude with her hair covering her breasts; however, she also noted that the pictures were meant to be private and that said that she was surprised that they had found their way to the internet.

During the filming of Arwah Goyang Karawang (The Dancing Spirit of Karawang), Persik got into a "catfight" with fellow actress Julia Perez. Both later filed police reports, with Perez later being brought to trial in May 2011.

In early 2011, Persik underwent hymen reconstruction surgery in As-Salam International Hospital, Cairo, Egypt after going on the hajj. She said that she didn't want to "disappoint her future husband"; she noted that she was proud of her secondary virginity. After facing incredulity, she produced medical records to prove that she was "officially" a virgin.

As of September 2011, she is expected to act in the horror/comedy Pacar Hantu Perawan (Boyfriend of a Virgin Ghost) along with an unnamed foreign porn star. She noted that, although there would be a love story in the movie, it would be chaste enough for Indonesian culture. She is currently managed by Ahmad Dhani's Republik Cinta Manajemen.

== Personal life ==
Persik has been married two times. Her first marriage was to fellow dangdut singer Saiful Jamil; they were married on 26 June 2005 and divorced on 14 January 2008. Her second was to actor Aldiansyah Taher; they entered a siri marriage (unrecognized by the government, but recognized by tradition) on 4 July 2008, later splitting in 2009.

== Case ==
Following her on-set clash with Julia Perez, Persik was in February 2014 sentenced to three months in jail by the Supreme Court.

== Filmography ==
=== Film ===
Year	Film title	Role
2008	Tali Pocong Perawan	Virnie
2008	Tiren: Mati Kemaren	Ranti
2008	Ku Tunggu Jandamu	Persik Wulandari
2008	Setan Budeg	Anita
2009	Susuk Pocong	Klien Zul
2009	Paku Kuntilanak	Kuntilanak
2010	Tiran: Mati di Ranjang	Susan
2010	Lihat Boleh, Pegang Jangan	Salma
2011	Arwah Goyang Jupe-Depe	Lilis
2011	Pacar Hantu Perawan	Mandy
2011	Arwah Kuntilanak Duyung	Linda
2012	Mr. Bean Kesurupan Depe	Marny
2013	Pantai Selatan	Larasati
2013	Bangkit dari Lumpur	Shakira

=== TV Series ===
Year	Title	Role	Network
2006–2007	Mimpi Manis	Lilis / Desi	
2009	Laila	Laila	
2011	Saudara Oesman		Trans 7
2016	Centini	Centini	MNCTV
2017	Nadin	Nadin	ANTV
