= Lesti Kejora =

Indonesian singer

Lesti
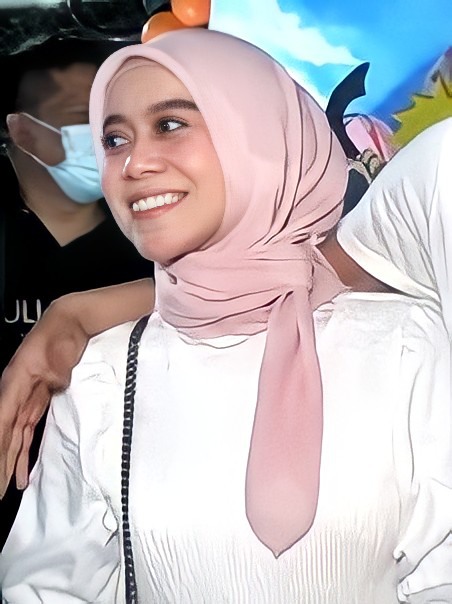
- Lesti in 2021
- Born: Lestiani; 5 August 1999 (age 27); Bandung, West Java, Indonesia
- Other names: Lesti Kejora; Lesti DA; Lesti D'Academy; Lesti
- Occupations: Singer; Actress; Business Woman; Television Personality
- Years active: 2014–present
- Spouse: Rizky Billar (m. 2021)
- Musical career
- Genres: Dangdut; Pop
- Label: Trinity Optima Production

Lestiani better known with the mononym Lesti (born 5 August 1999) is an Indonesian singer, dangdut diva, actress, business woman and television personality of Sundanese origin. In her earliest releases, she is known as Lesti DA (meaning Lesti Dangdut Academy) or Lesti Kejora (based on her first similarly titled hit "Kejora").

Although she sings in various genres, she primarily sings Dangdut music, a genre of Indonesian folk that is partly derived and fused from Hindustani, Arabic music and Malay and local folk music. Lesti has been instrumental in popularizing Dangdut throughout music fandom in Indonesia, Malaysia, Singapore and Brunei Darussalam. She is signed to Trinity Optima Production. She has also acted in a number of film productions. After various appearances without any Islamic attire, she decided to wear a hijab in the later part of her career. Her collaborations with other artists have earned her accolades and awards, particularly her work with Fildan Rahayu, Rizky Billar and Danang in duets. Her collaboration with notable songwriters such as Nur Bayan and Pak Ngah resulted in massive hits for her.

Lesti started singing at a very young age. By age 8, she had stage experience singing in public at various venues. At age 14, she auditioned for the regionals of D'Academy (Dangdut Academy) on the Indosiar television network. Her audition in Cianjur earned her a golden ticket qualifying her directly to the Jakarta main pan-Indonesian show. She won the title in the first season of Indonesia's D'Academy talent competition in 2014 due to her distinctive and powerful voice. Immediately after, Lesti released her debut single "Kejora", which was created by Nur Bayan and was her winning song from the show. She also won a monetary prize and a car. At the end of 2015 she took part in D'Academy Asia, finishing runner-up to the winner Danang Pradana Dieva.

Lesti has received top awards in the Indonesian dangdut music industry and countless nominations, including at the Ahugerah Music Indonesia (AMI) Awards 2017 where she won the "Best Dangdut Male / Female Solo Artist" category for the song "Egois". She won it again in 2020 for her song "Tirani". She is continuing her education at Mercu Buana University since 2018.

In 2020, Lesti sat as a juror during the Liga Dangdut Indonesia talent competition on the Indosiar television channel. She has also appeared on a number of television mini-series.

Lesti married with Rizky Billar on August 19, 2021.

== Personal life ==
Lesti become engaged to actor Rizky Billar on 13 June 2021, and they married on 19 August 2021.

== Discography ==
=== Singles ===
- 2014: "Kejora"
- 2015: "Zapin Melayu"
- 2017: "Egois"
- 2017: "Buka Mata Hati"
- 2018: "Mati Gaya"
- 2018: "Purnama"
- 2018: "Lebih Dari Selamanya" (feat. Fildan Rahayu)
- 2019: "Ada Cerita"
- 2020: "Tirani"
- 2020: "Ku Lepas Dengan Ikhlas"
- 2021: "Bismillah Cinta" (feat Ungu)
- 2021: "Bawa Aku ke Penghulu"
- 2021: "Takdir Cinta" (Feat Rizky Billar)
- 2022: "Lentera"
- 2022: "Sekali Seumur Hidup"
- 2023: "Insan Biasa"
- 2023: "Di Arsyi-Mu"
- 2023: "Bukan Cinta Biasa"

== Television ==
- 2020: Liga Dangdut Indonesia on Indosiar – Judge
- 2020: Beraksi Di Rumah Saja on Indosiar – Host / Presenter
- 2020: Tasbih on Indosiar – Presenter
- 2021–2022: D'Academy on Indosiar – Judge

== Awards and nominations ==
Year	Award event	Category	Result
2015	SCTV Music Awards 2015	Most Popular Dangdut Song (for "Kejora")	Won
2015	SCTV Music Awards 2015	Most Popular Newcomer	Nominated
2015	Indonesian Dangdut Awards 2015	Most Popular Female Newcomer	Won
2016	Anugerah Musik Indonesia 2016	Best Contemporary Dangdut Female Solo Artist	Nominated
2016	SCTV Music Awards 2016	Most Popular Female Dangdut Singer	Won
2016	Inbox Awards 2016	Best Inbox Female Dangdut Singer	Won
2016	Indonesian Dangdut Awards 2016	Most Popular Female Dangdut Solo Singer	Nominated
2016	Indonesian Dangdut Awards 2016	Most Popular Dangdut Song	Nominated
2017	Anugerah Musik Indonesia 2017	Best Dangdut Male / Female Solo Artist	Won
2017	Indonesian Dangdut Awards 2017	Most Popular Dangdut Song (for "Egois")	Won
2017	Indonesian Dangdut Awards 2017	Most Popular Female Dangdut Singer	Nominated
2017	Anugerah Dangdut Indonesia 2017	Best Video Clip (for "Buka Mata Hati")	Won
2017	Anugerah Dangdut Indonesia 2017	Fanbase of Dangdut Tersosmed (for the Lesti Lovers)	Nominated
2018	Konser Sosial Media LIDA 2018	Bestst Sosmed Celebrity Social Media Concert	Won
2018	Indonesian Dangdut Awards 2018	Most Popular Female Dangdut Solo Singer	Nominated
2018	Indonesian Dangdut Awards 2018	Most Popular Dangdut Song (for "Purnama")	Nominated
2018	Indonesian Dangdut Awards 2018	Social Media Darling	Won
2018	SCTV Music Awards 2018	Most Popular Dangdut Singer	Nominated
2019	Anugerah Dangdut Indonesia 2019	The Best Duo / Group / Collaboration of Contemporary Dangdut (with Fildan Rahayu)	Won
2019	Indonesian Dangdut Awards 2019	Most Popular Female Dangdut Solo Singer	Nominated
2019	Indonesian Dangdut Awards 2019	Most Popular Dangdut Song ("Lebih dari selamanya with Fildan Rahayu)	Nominated
2019	Indonesian Dangdut Awards 2019	Most Popular Dangdut Duo / Group / Collaboration (with Fildan Rahayu)	Won
2019	Anugerah Musik Indonesia 2019	Best Dangdut Male / Female Solo Artist	Nominated
2019	Anugerah Musik Indonesia 2019	Best Contemporary Dangdut Male / Female Solo Artist	Nominated
2019	Anugerah Musik Indonesia 2019	Duo / Group / Best Contemporary Dangdut / Dangdut Collaboration (with Fildan Rahayu)	Won
2020	Anugerah Syiar Ramadhan 2020	Inspirational Young Host	Won
2020	Konser Sosial Media LIDA 2020	Favorite Jury	Won
2020	Konser Sosial Media LIDA 2020	Most Favorite Moment (with Rizky Billar)	Won
2020	Konser Sosial Media LIDA 2020	Favorite Duet (with Rizky Billar)	Won
2020	Anugerah Dangdut Indonesia 2020	Best Dangdut Song (for "Tirani")	Won
2020	Anugerah Dangdut Indonesia 2020	Best Female Dangdut Singer	Nominated
2020	Anugerah Dangdut Indonesia 2020	Most Popular Dangdut Singer	Nominated
2020	Anugerah Dangdut Indonesia 2020	Fanbase Tergaul (for the Lesti Lovers)	Nominated
2020	Anugerah Musik Indonesia 2020	Best Dangdut Male / Female Solo Artist (for "Tirani")	Won
