= Elvy Sukaesih =

Indonesian dangdut singer (born 1951)

- Born: 25 June 1951 (age 75); Sumedang, West Java, Indonesia
- Occupations: Singer; actress
- Years active: 1964–present
- Musical career
- Genre: Dangdut
- Labels: HP Records; Musica Studios

Elvy Sukaesih (born 25 June 1951) is an Indonesian dangdut singer and actress who has been dubbed the Queen of Dangdut. Sukaesih has a significant fan base in other Asian countries such as Japan. She has been a prolific recording artist since the late 1960s.

== Discography ==
Albums

- Raja Dan Ratu - Rhoma Irama and Elvy Sukaesih 1975
- Pesta Panen, 1990
- The Return of Diva, 1992

Contributing artist

- The Rough Guide to the Music of Indonesia (2000, World Music Network)
