= Minangkabau music =

Variety of Indonesian ethnic music

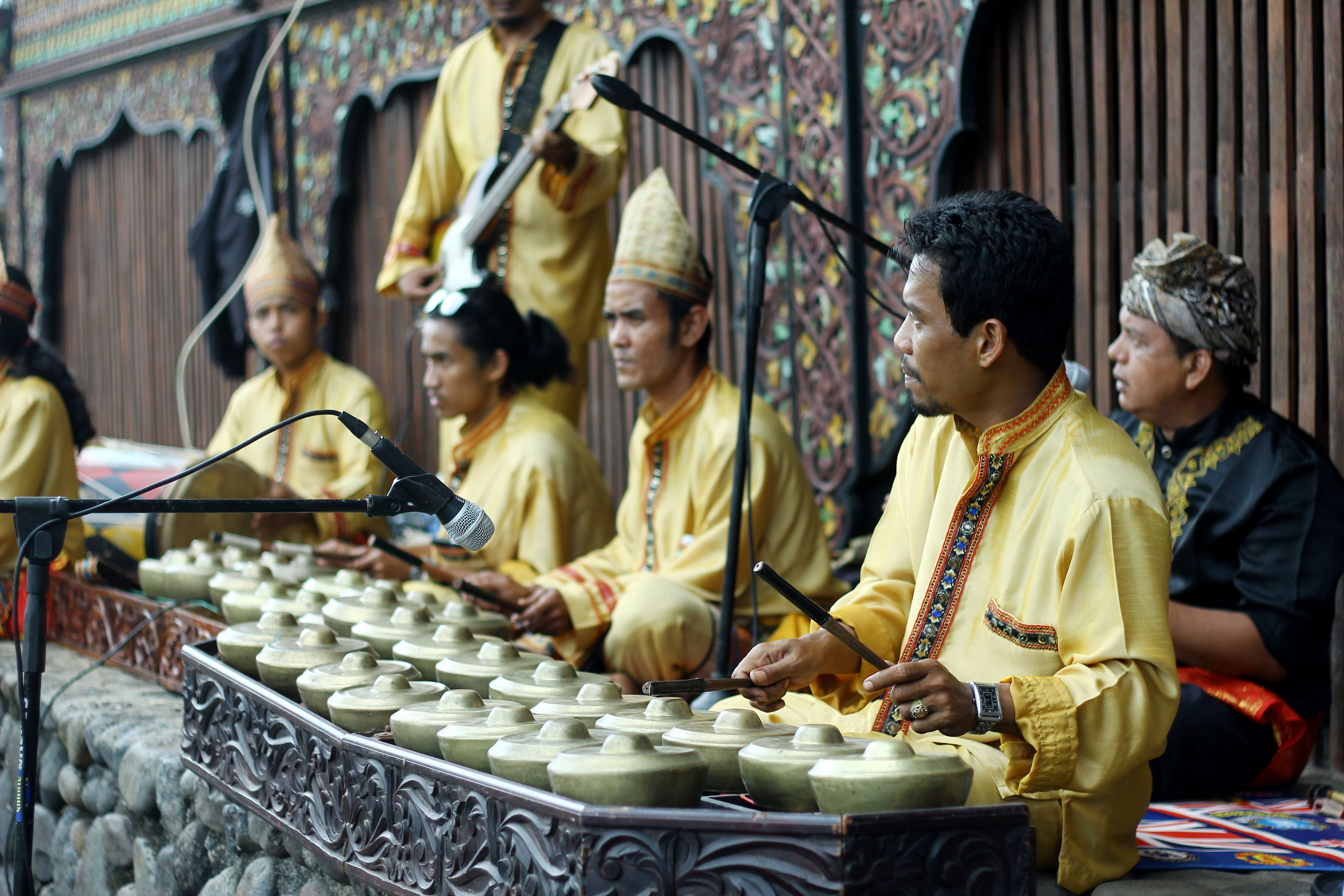
Talempong performance

Music of Minang is a traditional and contemporary ethnic variety of Indonesian music that grows and develops in the Minangkabau culture. Music is generally played by musical instruments such as talempong, saluang, Minang rabab, serunai, rebana, aguang (gong), gandang, gambus, and violin. However, for traditional events such as weddings, Islamic rebana or gambus are never used.

With hindsight, the beginning of Minang music has its roots, as in native folk music, including indigenous songs and Talempong gong music, Dendang as a Minang style of vocal music that can accompanied several forms of Minangkabau oral literature, such as kaba (stories), pantun, and salawat dulang. Minang music is also played to accompany various dances such as the Pasambahan dance, the Payung dance, and the Piring dance.

Qasidah which originated as the arrival and spread of Islam in the archipelago from Arabic, Gujarati and Persian, its character was readings of syair poetry and then sung. Therefore, initially the poetry used was originally sung from gurindam, and was gradually used to accompany the dance.

Then in the late 19th century Modern Minang music was emerged, when traditional talempong gong style incorporated into its repertoire Minang pop songs. And around 1955 Contemporary Minang popular music was born, influenced by several Western genres.

== Traditional Minang music ==
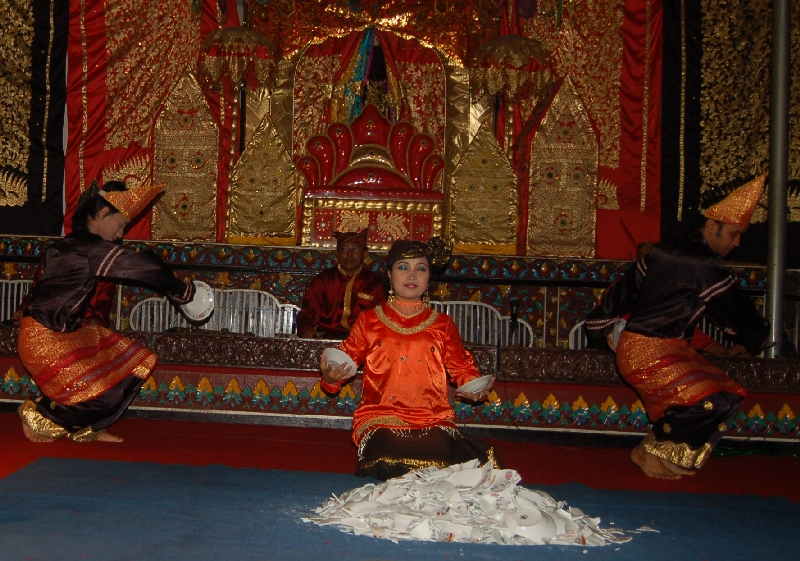
Piring dance ("Plate dance")

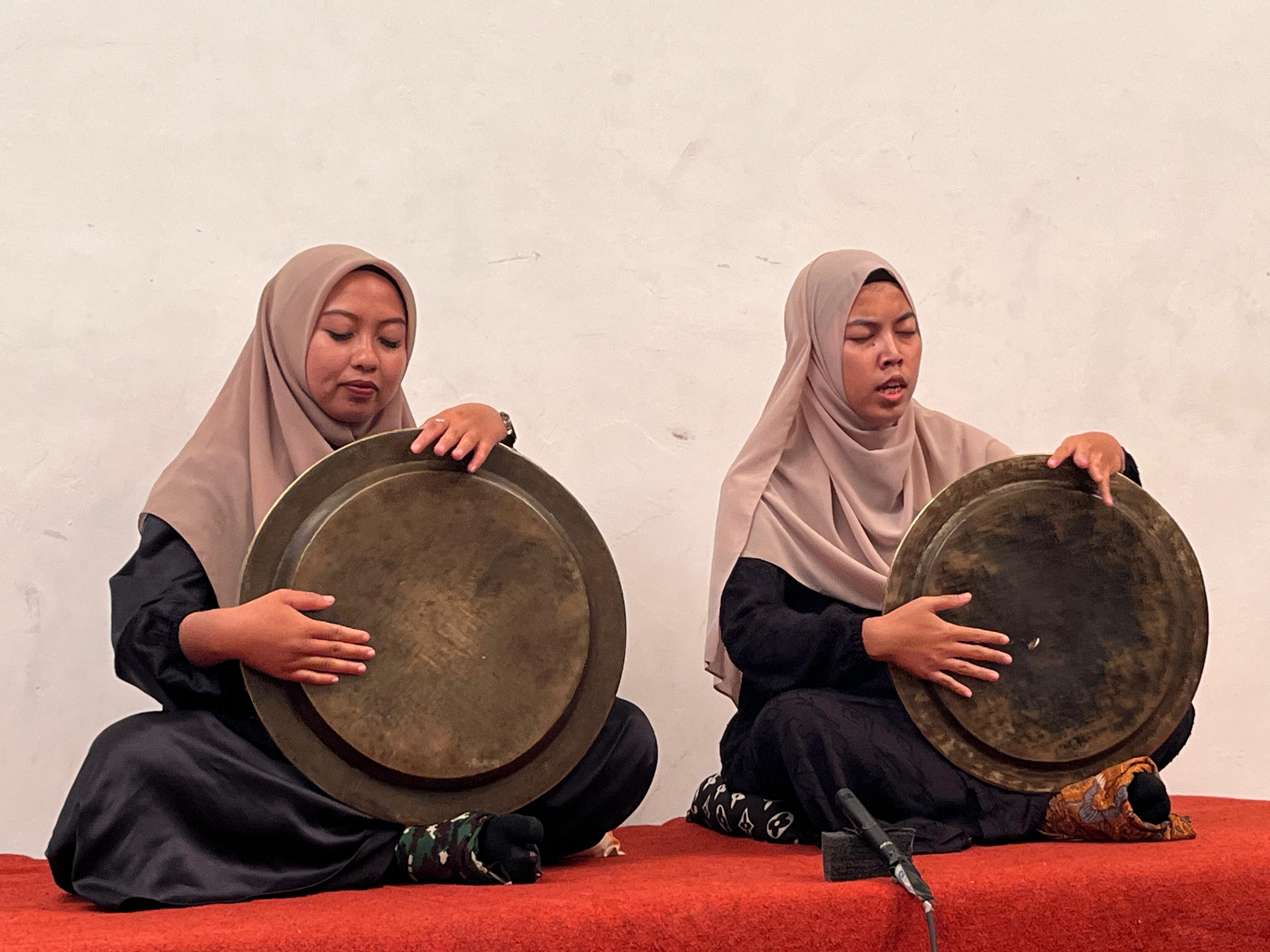
Salawat dulang with rebana performance

Traditional Minang music whose origins are related to Malay music is characterized by the Minang style or rent and traditional Minang musical instruments. Minang traditional musical instruments (see description below), namely: saluang, agung (gong), gondang, rebana, serunai, talempong, Minang rabab, gambus, and bansi. However, for traditional events such as weddings, Islamic rebana or gambus are never used.

Minang music was originally from such native pre-Islamic folk music genres as indigenous songs, dances and several styles of the Talempong gong ensembles that is comparable with Javanese Gamelan.

Minang music is played to accompany various dances such as the Pasambahan dance, the Payung dance, and the Piring dance typical of the Minangkabau

Dendang is a style of vocal music that developed in Minangkabau society as a singing tradition and accompanied by the saluang and other musical instruments. Dendang accompanies kaba, oral stories that can be read or sung by a kaba master accompanied by the rubbing of a rebab (or matchsticks for the sijobang stories). Apart from kaba, dendang with musical instruments accompanies such oral genres as pantun and salawat dulang, and some dances too.

Another root was qasidah which originated as the arrival and spread of Islam in the archipelago and, especially, in West Sumatra in the 16th century. Its character is reading religious syair poetry and then reading gurindam, then gradually used also to accompany dances. The musical instruments used are only limited to percussion instruments in the form of striking bamboo, wood and stone, then also tambourines.

At the time since the opening of the Suez Canal there was a flow of migration of Arabs and Egyptians to the Dutch East Indies in 1870 until after 1888, they brought gambus instruments and played Arabic music. This influence is also mixed with traditional music with Gurindam poetry and local traditional musical instruments such as the gong, saluang, serunai, tambourine, talempong, violin, etc.

== Modern Minang music. Minang pop ==
The emergence of modern Minang popular music that sometimes generally called Minang pop traced to the late 19th century, when traditional Talempong gong style ensembles incorporated into thear repertoire Minang pop songs. Of course this style of playing music is far different from its origin as Qasidah, because the development of this period is not only singing Gurindam poetry, but has far developed as entertainment music for singing and accompaniment of dances.

Contemporary Minang music was born around 1955 with Orkes Gumarang. During 1950s–60s Minang pop created by the composers Ibenzani Usman and Yusaf Rahman, the lyricist Syahrul Tarun Yusuf and others and played by Orkes Kumbang Tjari together with its leading workers Nuskan Sjarif and Elly Kasim, singers-songwriters Oslan Husein with his encemble Teruna Ria and Tiar Ramon, singers Fetty and Nurseha, and Zaenal Combo group. It is influenced by Latin music with bongo punches and marakas games, usually a rhythm similar to rumba, cha-cha-cha, or mambo. Modern Minang music is also the forerunner of Dangdut along with Malay music. The musical instruments used developed with the entry of European musical instruments such as accordion, violin, guitar, piano or keyboard, bass, drums, bongo, saxophone, clarinet, trumpet, flute, maracas, and so on.

In the 1970s, a more traditional music genre emerged, namely Gamad with Minang-style vocals and Portuguese musical instruments. Albums by songwriter and singer Yan Juneid Sarunai Aceh and Bunga Tanjuang are referred to as albums of the revival of Minang music which was previously dominated by Western and Indonesian songs. Among other figures, singer-songwriter Rustam Raschani and singer Upik Saunang.

Two legendary figures of Minang pop from the 1970s who did not mix the traditional Dendang singing style with non-Minang music (Malay, Arabic, Indian, Western) were songwriters and singers Adjis Sutan Sati and Sawir Sutan Mudo.

Minang-language songs of the 20th – 21st century are very open in their form to the influence of other forms of music, starting from (1) Pop (songwriters Agusli Taher and B. Andoeska, singers-songwriters Alkawi, Asben and Nedi Gampo, singers Zalmon, Ajo Buset, Alwi Oslan, Amelda Lesty, Amriz Arifin, An Roys, Asman, Ayu Dewi, Azmi Nentis, Beniqno, Betharia Sonatha, Boy Shandy, Christin Aziz, Eddy Silitonga, Efrinon, Elda, Elvia, Fauzana, Hetty Koes Endang, Irni Yusnita, Iyeth Bustami, Jhon Kinawa, Joni Linggo, Kardi Tanjung, Kintani, Lia Lidora, Lily Syarif, Loura, Ocha Oktavia, Ratu Sikumbang, Rayola, Ria Amelia, Rina Fhasma, Rosinda YS, Roza, Ruskam, Seruni Pilang, Upiak Isil, Vanny Vabiola, Vivied Yuza, Waty Tanjung, Wirdaningsih, Wisye Pranadewi, Yan Bastian, Yen Rustam, Yenny Puspita, and Carano's Band), (2) Dangdut, both in the regional subgenre of dendang saluang dangdut (Cimpago group together with Erri Tamala and Mel Rah Cani, Adjis Sutan Sati, Asben, Ellyzamiarti, Gafur Syah, Misramolai, Nisya Laila, Sawir Sutan Mudo, Upik Malay, Yenny Mustika) and common dangdut (singer and songwriter Ujang Virgo, singers Amriz Arifin, Beniqno, Daniel Saniara, Devi Rose, Dhinda Rozi, Fani Sun, Leni Alvin, Liza Tania, Ralmi Muas, Riri Anjeli, Sahar Panker, Tety Liany), (3) Reggae (Melati, Upik Saunang, Yan Juneid, and others), (4) Pop rock, rock-n-roll and rock (Andra Respati, Chika Andriani, Fabian, Elsa Pitaloka, Eno Viola, Ipank, Ovhi Firsty, Rayola, Sultan Tanjung, Thomas Arya), even (5) Disco, dance-pop dan electronic dance music similar to Indonesian Funkot (Chika Andriani, Elda, Fani Sun, Jushia, Liza Tania, Loura, Misramolai, Mita Viose, Novi Barat, Ratu Sikumbang, Regina, Ria Amelia, Riri Anjeli, Uria Novita, Yenny Mustika, and duet Ririn Trichani & Asnaria Jambak).

In contemporary music, two trends coexist: (1) an ethnic pop, the use of traditional Minang musical elements in works (for example, some songs of the young singers Amelda Lesty and Joni Linggo are accompanied by the sound of the rabab) or (2) full adherence to national and international musical standards while maintaining the lyrics in the Minangkabau language, such as a number of sentimental ballads.

== Traditional musical instruments ==
=== Saluang ===
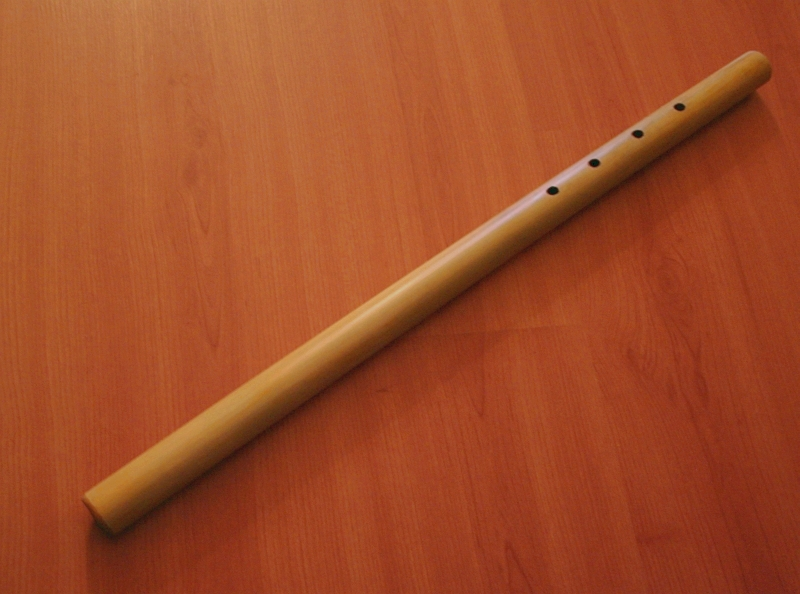
Saluang

Saluang is a traditional musical instrument typical of Minangkabau, West Sumatra. This woodwind instrument is made of thin bamboo or gutters, where the Minangkabau people believe that the best material for making saluang comes from gutters for clothespins or gutters that are found drifting in the river.

In this class of musical instruments is the flute, but there are only four holes. Saluang length is approximately 40–60 cm, with a diameter of 3–4 cm. Talang is also used to make lemang, the traditional Minangkabau sticky rice cake. This instrument can produce sound by blowing it at the corner of the edge or the upper cavity. So that in accordance with the principles of acoustic physics, the blow that comes out of the mouth will vibrate the inner walls of the saluang in such a way as to produce sound. Saluang is set with several holes, usually there are 4 holes. That way saluang can produce diatonic tone frequencies. This is also one of the hallmarks of this instrument.

The legendary saluang player named Idris Sutan Sati with his singer Syamsimar.

The virtue of these saluang players is that they can play the saluang by blowing and inhaling simultaneously, so that the saluang player can play the instrument from the beginning of the end of the song without breaking. This mode of breathing is developed with constant practice. This technique is also known as the angok elimination technique. Not just anyone who can blow this Saluang, requires special training in order to be able to make Saluang's distinctive sound, which is dark, mysterious and gothic. Each village in Minangkabau has developed a way of blowing the saluang, so that each village has its own style. Examples of this style are Singgalang, Pariaman, Solok Salayo, Koto Tuo, Suayan and Pauah.

The Singgalang style is considered quite difficult to play by beginners, and usually this Singgalang tone is played at the beginning of the song. The saddest style is Ratok Solok from the Solok area. Meanwhile, the type of saluang which can be said to be deadly, comes from the Payakumbuah area, has a magical nuance, as an introduction to magic, is colored with magic lyrics, known as Saluang Sirompak, derived from the root word rompak, which means force.

Basirompak is an effort to force one's mind -with the help of supernatural powers- to obey the wishes of those who pirate. This ritual is performed by a pawang (sirompak craftsman) who is assisted by a saluang sirompak player and a soybean craftsman. The handler is tasked with singing mantras and playing a top (gasiang tangkurak), one part of which is made from pieces of a human skull.

Often this ritual is performed in Saluang media, so it is known as Basirompak, an art related to shamanic ritual activities or magic song. If a man is insulted and insulted by a woman whom the man likes, then the man asks the devil for help with the help of the shaman through syringe. So, the insulting woman became crazy about him and found it difficult to forget the man.

The game of Saluang is usually in a crowd event such as a marriage ceremony, a house batagak, a pangulu batagak, and others. This game is usually held after the Isha prayer and ends near dawn. On another occasion, the beautiful Minang virgins contain messages, satire, and also subtle criticism that restore the listener's memory of their hometown or of the life that has been, is, and will be lived.

=== Bansi (Minang flute) ===
Bansi or Suling Minang with 7 holes (like a recorder), is short, and can play traditional and modern songs because it has a standard (diatonic) tone. Bansi size is about 33.5 – 36 cm with a diameter between 2.5–3 cm. Bansi is also made of gutters (thin bamboo) or sariak (a type of thin, thin bamboo).

This musical instrument is a bit difficult to play, in addition to the length that is hard to reach by the fingers, it is also difficult to blow it.

=== Pupuik Batang Padi ===
This traditional musical instrument is made from rice stalks. At the end of the stem segment is made a tongue, if it is blown it will produce a gap, causing a sound. While the ends are wrapped with coconut leaves that resemble trumpets. The sound is shrill and the tone is generated by playing the fingers on the coiled coconut leaves. Now before the new year there is a new year's trumpet which is similar to this musical instrument, the difference is that now using plastic and a funnel using cardboard, and given the color gold.

=== Serunai ===
The chrysanthemum, derived from the word Shehnai, is a musical instrument in the Indian Kashmir valley, consisting of two pieces of bamboo that are not equal in size; a small piece can fit into a larger piece; with a function as a tone generator. This instrument has four tone holes, which will produce a melodic sound. This tool is rarely used, in addition to being difficult to make, the resulting tone is also not used much.

=== Papuik Tanduak ===
This musical instrument is made from buffalo horn (hoorn), and the ends are cut flat for blowing. The shape is shiny and clean black. Does not function as a singing or dance accompaniment, so as a whistle, without holes, so that only a single note. In the past, it was used for cues to the community, for example notifications at dawn and sunset or there were announcements from village leaders. In the past, the horns were used by large sailing ships as a sign or command to the crew, while the Arabs used drums and Europeans used bells and horns, and in the past, steam trains used bells when passing through crowds.

=== Talempong ===
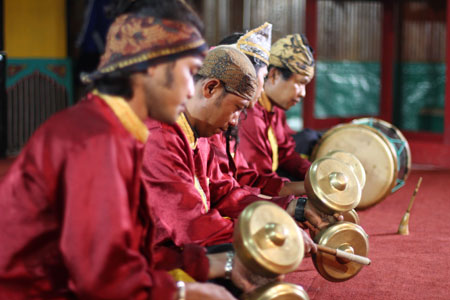
Talempong

Talempong, in Java it is called bonang, which is in the form of a small gong that is laid flat, and is made of brass, but some are also made of wood and stone. sounded it with a wooden punch. Usually talempong is used to accompany the Plate Dance, where the dancer rings the plate with the ring, and is interlocked. The chord starts with Do and ends with Si. How to play like marimba or kempul with a double note (left and right hand).

=== Rebab (rabab Minang) ===
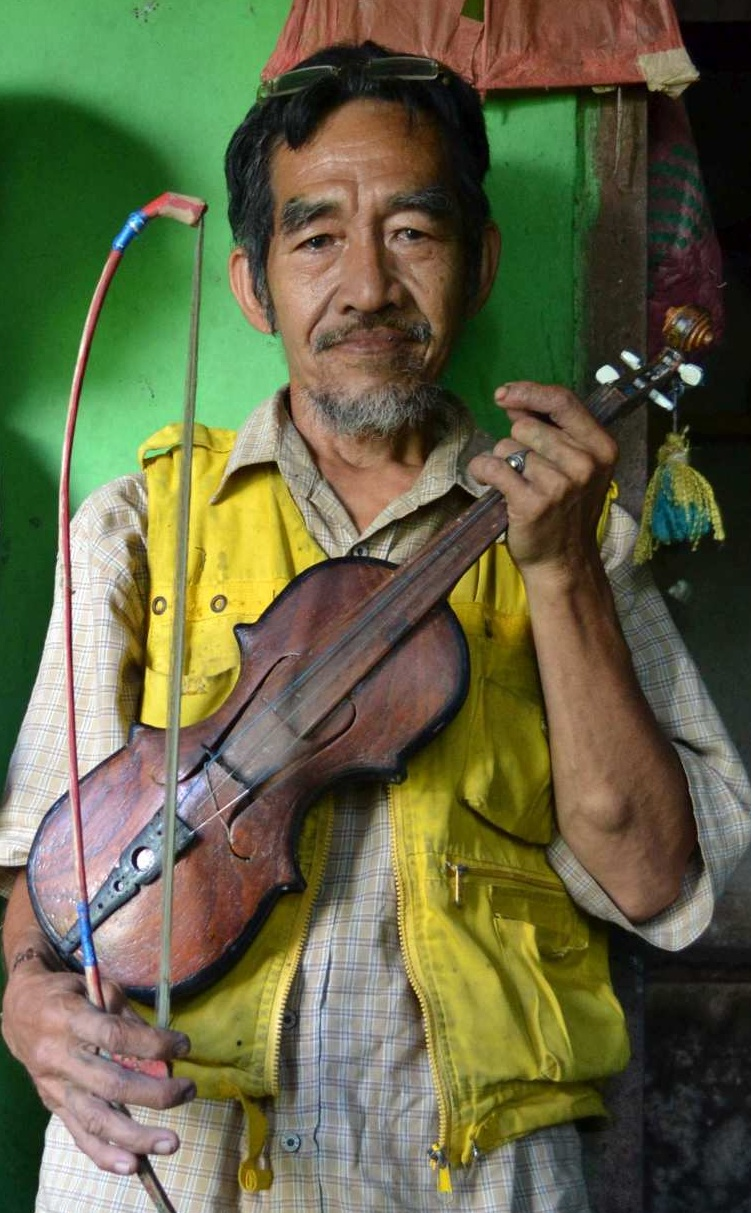
Musician with Minang rebab

Minang rabab comes from Arabic as rebab, there are also other areas such as Deli, Sunda, Java, etc. Rabab Minang is unique, besides being rubbed there is also a sound membrane under the bridge, so it has another effect (hoarseness). This unique property makes swiping difficult too. This rabab body is made from coconut shells (Cocos nucifera).

=== Aguang (gong) ===
The term gong in the Minang language is aguang, the form is the same as in other areas, such as in Malay, Sundanese, Javanese, etc. The gong is usually the first, third, or closing stroke, while the gong is small in the second and fourth strokes. Then there are also variations according to the range.

=== Gandang (Minang kendang drum) ===
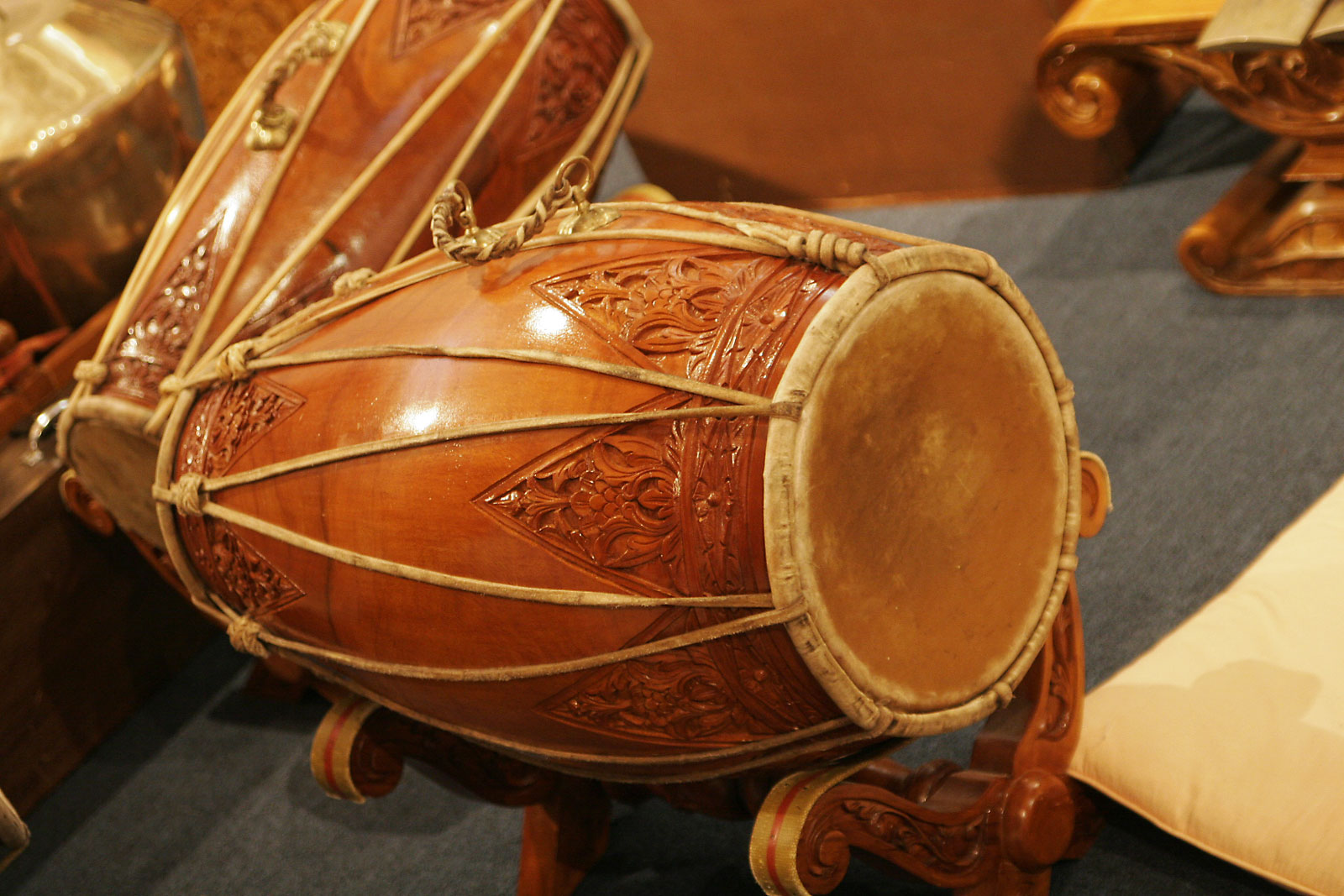
Gandang

The term kendang drum in the Minang language is gandang (in the Karo Batak gondang language), the shape is the same as in other areas, such as in Malay, Batak, Sundanese, Javanese, etc. The way to play is the same, namely the small circle side on the left and the bigger one on the right. However, the method of hitting between each region is very different, namely in Minang depending on the type of song beat. Gandang Tasa is a traditional art of drumming which is popular in Padang Pariaman Regency.

=== Biola (Minang Biola) ===
The violin later also became a traditional Minang musical instrument with several modifications according to the Minang tradition: the rabala and rabab darek. Rabab Pesisir Selatan (Rabab Pasisia) is one of the famous rabab games in West Sumatra with the famous rabab player, Hasan Basri.

== Recordings and awards ==
The development of the regional music recording industry began in 1951, initiated by Irama and Lokananta in Java. Subsequently, various companies and record labels in West Sumatra emerged to support the Minang music industry, including Tanama Record, Sinar Padang Record, Planet Record, Pitunang Record, and Caroline Record—all based in Padang—as well as Minang Record, Gita Virma Record, and Elta Record, which are located in Bukittinggi.

The Minang Music Award (Anugerah Musik Minang), presented by the Governor of West Sumatra, serves as the primary accolade for Minang musicians.

== See also ==
- Music of Sumatra
- Music of Indonesia
- Music of Malaysia
- Minangkabau people
