= Talempong orchestra =

Talempong orchestra is an Indonesian orchestra that uses the diatonic scale, played on Minang instruments. This orchestra is formed by the Conservatory Minang in Padang Panjang in 1960. Most of the instruments used in this orchestra are metallophone and idiophone (similar to kolenang in West Java gamelan), including the namesake instrument talempong. Talempong orchestra plays Minang song like Tak Tontong and other traditional songs.

== Disposition of players ==
- Very front: a conductor
- First row: saluang, bangsi, drums and tanburun players
- Second row: four talempong players-jawo xylofon types (similar to the gamelan saron). Playing in tone d, e, fis, g, a, b, cis, d
- Third row: three talempong players who play the tone cis, d, e, fis, g, a, b, cis, d
- Fourth row: three talempong players
- Fifth row: the gong player who uses the gong with the barrel as, d, a
