= Mansyur S. =

Indonesian singer, songwriter and actor (born 1948)

- Born: Mansyur Subhawannur; November 30, 1948 (age 77); Jakarta, Indonesia
- Other name: Mansyur S.
- Occupations: singer, songwriter, actor
- Years active: 1969–present
- Musical career
- Genres: Dangdut
- Instrument: vocal
- Labels: Pratama Records; Dian Records; HP Music; Musica Studios

Mansyur S. (born Mansyur Subhawannur; November 30, 1948) is an Indonesian singer, songwriter and actor. He is a star of the dangdut style of Indonesian music. He sings with an ensemble called Dangdut Manis, or "Sweet Dangdut". He appears on the Smithsonian Folkways collection, Indonesian Popular Music: Krongcong, Dangdut, & Langgam Jawa. These songs are his most famous songs: "Rembulan Bersinar Lagi" and "Anak Siapa".
