= Vanny Vabiola =

Indonesian singer (born 1986)

- Born: 1986 (age 39–40)
- Origin: Padang, West Sumatra, Indonesia
- Genres: Pop; Minangkabau pop
- Occupation: Singer
- Instrument: Vocals
- Years active: 2000–present
- Spouse: Decky Ryan

Vanny Vabiola (born 1986) is an Indonesian pop and Minangkabau pop singer from Padang, West Sumatra. Active since 2000, she had released 20 studio albums by 2020. She gained popularity after uploading herself singing covers of Celine Dion songs on YouTube in 2019.

== Life and career ==
Vanny Vabiola was born in the West Sumatran city of Padang in 1986. Her singing ability was noted by her parents from an early age, and she was tutored by her mother. She released her debut album, Panggang Maco, in 1991, while still in kindergarten.

At the beginning of her career, Vabiola sang traditional Minangkabau music at events in her home province of West Sumatra as well as other parts of Indonesia. She also performed Quranic recitation. In 2000, she took part in the National Quran Recitation Competition in Palu, Central Sulawesi.

Encouraged by her husband, singer-songwriter Decky Ryan, in 2019, Vabiola uploaded to YouTube a video of herself singing a cover of the Jennifer Rush song "The Power of Love", interpreting it in the style of Celine Dion, who herself covered it in 1993. By December 2020, the video had received more than three million views. She has since gone on to cover other popular Western songs, including Whitney Houston's "I Will Always Love You" and Diana Ross's "When You Tell Me That You Love Me".

Vabiola's original songs are written by her husband.

== Selected discography ==
- Panggang Maco (1991)
- Demi Cinta (Slow Rock) (2009)
- Buruang Jo Pikek with Decky Ryan (2012)
- Jambangan Perak (2012)
- Nisan Disudu Hati (2014)
- A Juo Lai De (2017)
- Lagu Minang Populer (2017)
- Sangkak Ameh (2017)
- Album Pop Minang Duet with Decky Ryan (2017)
- Pop Minang Vanny Vabiola (2018)
- Religi (2018)
- Album Cinta (2020)
- Album Kenangan (2020)
- Kengangen Baru (2020)
- Album Vanny Vabiola 2021 (EP, 2021)
- Bayanga Kasiah Dimalaysia (2022)
