= Music of Sumatra =

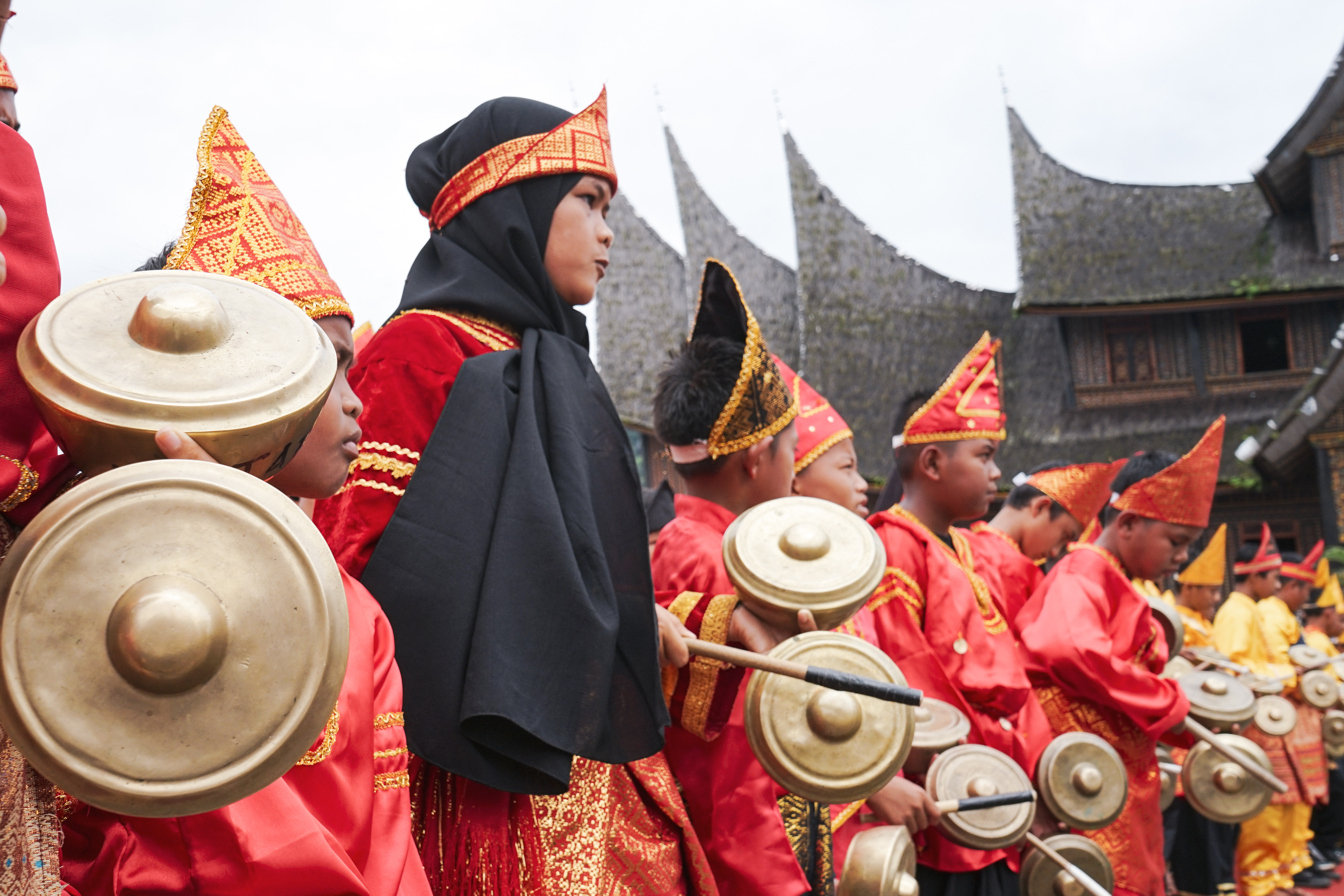
Talempong traditional music from West Sumatra, Indonesia

The music of Sumatra, Indonesia, is characterized by dangdut and the use of rabab and saluang instruments.

The Sumatran Toba people are distinctive in their use of tuned drums to carry the melody in their music; this practice is very rare worldwide. The Toba also use an instrument similar to the oboe and several kinds of gongs. Ensembles include the gondang sabangunan.

The Batak Mandailing people is one of the ethnic group from the Province of North Sumatra. Their cultural heritage is the gordang sambilan (nine drums graded in size from large to small), complemented by two big gongs (agung), a bamboo flute (sarune or saleot), and a pair of small cymbals (tali sasayat).

== Films ==
- 2007 – Sumatran Folk Cinema (dir. Mark Gergis and Alan Bishop; Sublime Frequencies)

== See also ==
- Music of Indonesia
- Music of Sunda
- Music of Java
- Music of Bali
