= Talempong =

Indonesian traditional musical instrument

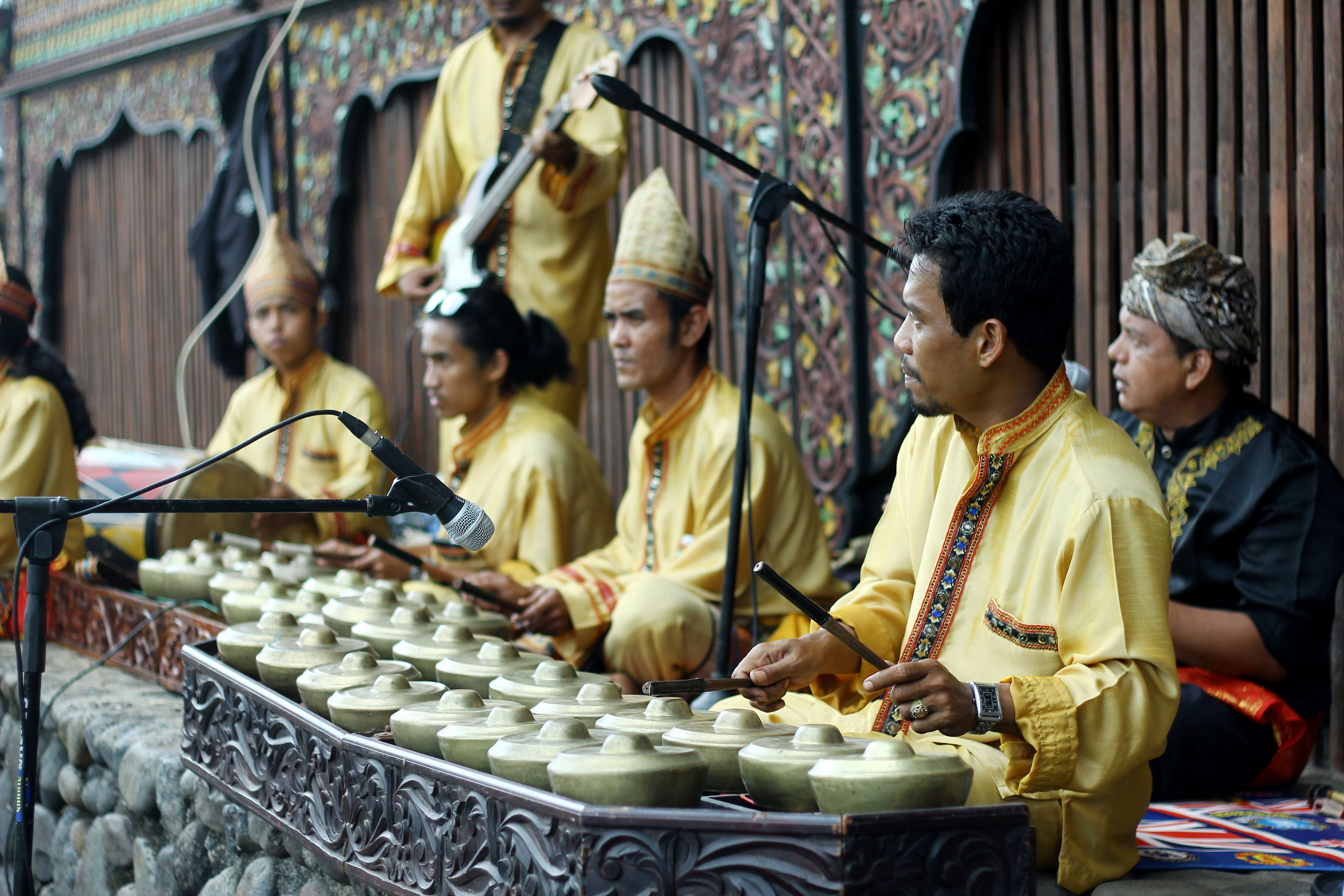
- Talempong performance in West Sumatra, Indonesia.
- Other names: Caklempong, Caklempung
- Classification: Percussion instrument; Idiophone; Gong
- Developed: Indonesia (West Sumatra)

Playing range
- Pelog and Slendro scales

Related instruments
- bonang, kenong, canang, keromong, kromong, kethuk, trompong/terompong, rejong, khong wong yai/khong wong lek, khong toch/ khong thom, khong vong, krewaing/krewong

More articles or information
- Gamelan; Kolintang

Talempong ensemble
- Stylistic origins: Music of Indonesia ( Minangkabau )
- Cultural origins: Indonesia
- Typical instruments: Talempong • Gong • Bonang • Agung • Serunai • Saluang • Gendang

Talempong is a traditional musical instrument of the Minangkabau people of Western Sumatra, Indonesia. The talempong produce a static texture consisting of interlocking rhythms.

A talempong a small kettle gong which gives its name to an ensemble of four or five talempong as well as other gongs and drums. The term can refer to the instrument, the ensemble, or the genre of music. Talempong is in the form of a circle with a diameter of 15 to 17.5 centimeters, with a hollow hole at the bottom while at the top there is a roundabout with a diameter of five centimeters as a place to be hit. Talempong has a different tone. The sound is produced from a pair of wood hammered on its surface.

Around 1970, at the Akademi Seni Karawitan (Academy of Traditional Arts) in Padang Pajang, a Talempong orchestra was developed with approximately 17 musicians.

In 2019 and 2021, The Talempong Unggan and The Talempong Pacik were recognized as National Intangible Cultural Heritage of Indonesia by the Indonesian Ministry of Education and Culture.

On December 15, 2021, UNESCO officially recognized Gamelan which includes a musical instrument of Talempong as a Masterpiece of the Oral and Intangible Heritage of Humanity, and encouraged the Indonesian people and the Indonesian government to safeguard, transmit, promote performances and to encourage the craftsmanship of the instruments.

== Cultural contexts ==
There are many different styles of talempong. Those that are considered older include talempong pacik ("handheld talempong") and talempong duduak ("seated talempong"). Those that are newer include talempong kreasi (new creation talempong) which evolved in the late 1960s and early 70s from the institution known at the time as Akademi Seni Karawitan Indonesia (ASKI) which is now known as Institut Seni Indonesia (ISI) Padang Panjang. A later development includes talempong goyang ("talempong that shakes or rocks") which brings in pop influences.

These ensembles can be used to accompany dance or welcoming performances, such as the typical Tari Piring, Tari Pasambahan, Tari Alang, Tari Suntiang Pangulu and Tari Gelombang. Depending on the style, a variety of instruments can be added to the talempong themselves: accordion, synthesizer, saluang, gandang, serunai and other traditional Minangkabau instruments.

Talempong can be used to play a wide variety of music traditional and modern. Talempong have also been used in some experimental gamelan pieces composed at Sekolah Tinggi Seni Indonesia Surakarta, which has West Sumatran instructors and students.

== Outside Indonesia ==
In Malaysia, the talempong was brought to Negeri Sembilan, Peninsular Malaysia, in the 14th century by Minangkabau people from nearby West Sumatra. Here, talempong is also known as caklempong.

The caklempong is present in the different configurations of the Nobat, a ceremonial traditional orchestra that is among the Regalia of Malaysia. Performances by the Nobat are limited to royal occasions, the ensemble playing an important role in the Installation of the Yang di-Pertuan Agong.

== Gallery ==
Talempong

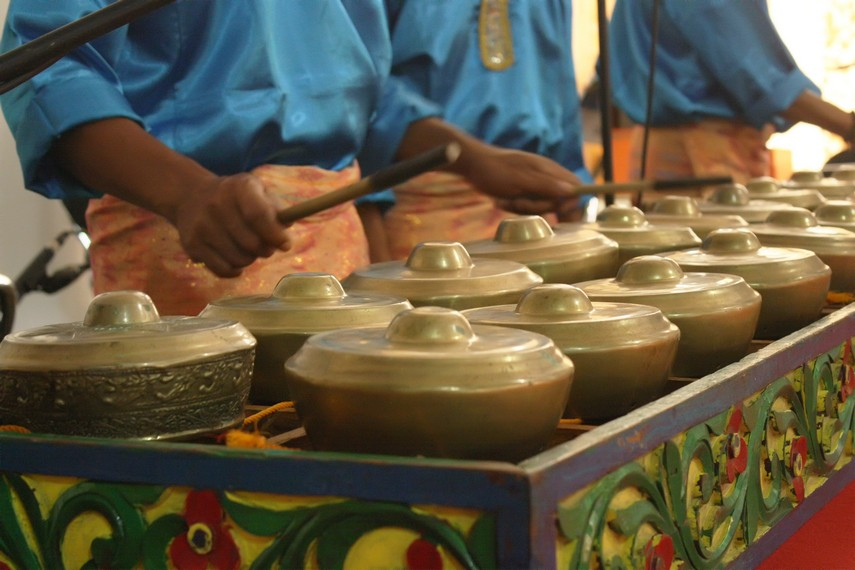
Gong of Talempong

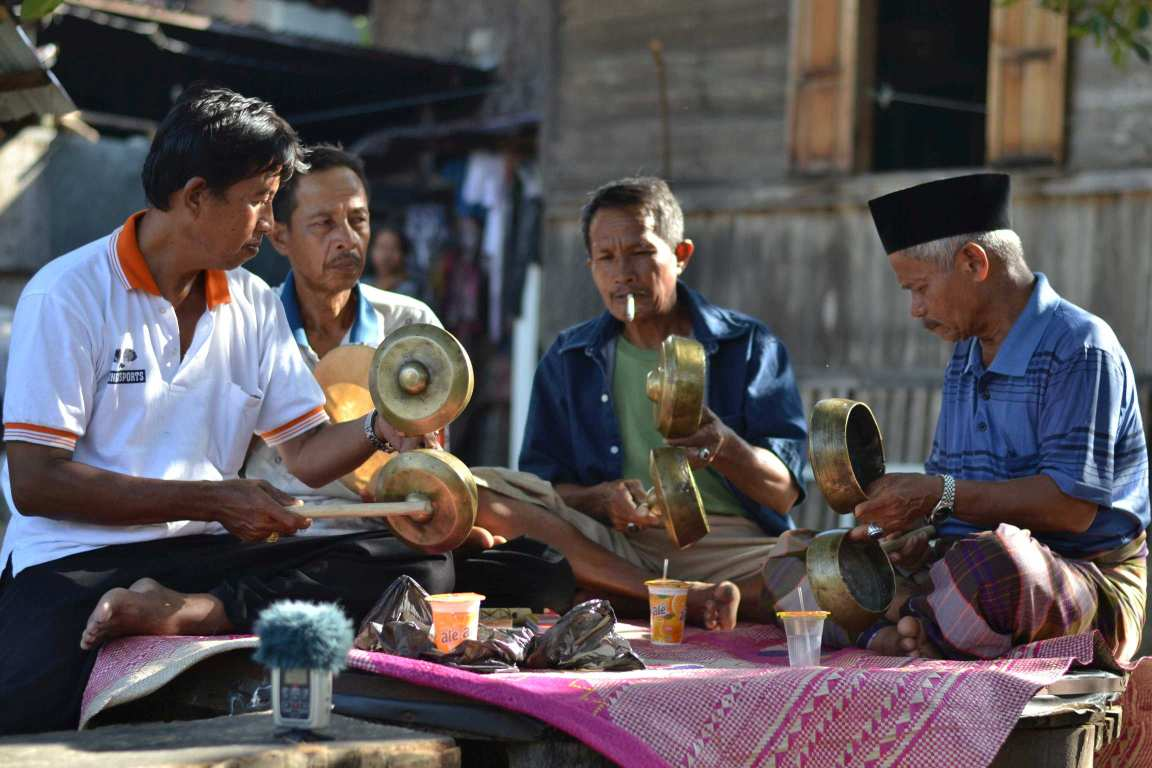
Talempong Pacik

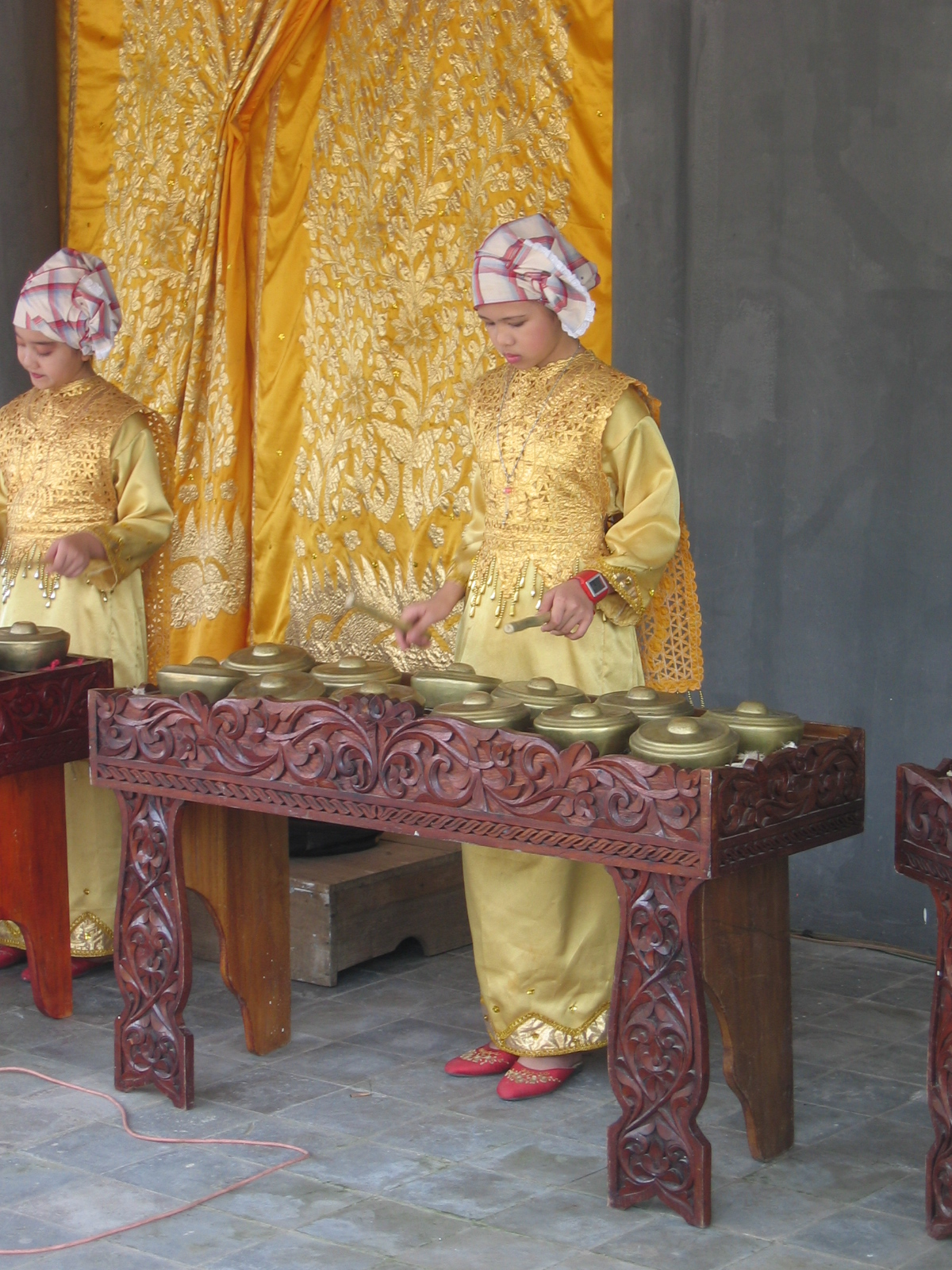
Playing talempong

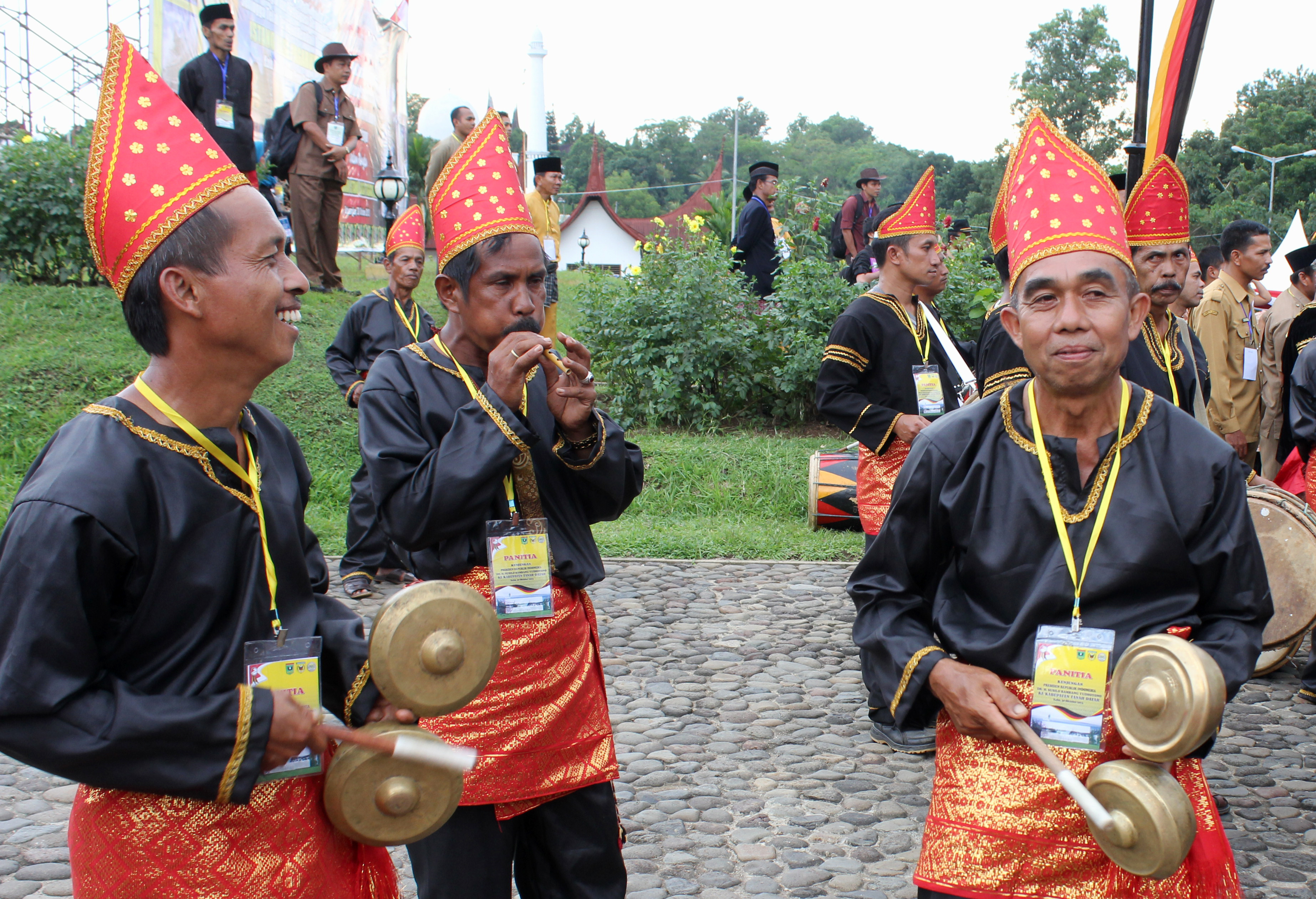
Playing talempong pacik together

Talempong Pacik for Ceremonial activity in West Sumatra

== See also ==
- Gamelan - gong chime music of Java, Bali, southern Sumatra
- Kulintang - a single row kettle gong instrument of the southern Philippines, northern Borneo, Sulawesi.
- Bonang - kettle gong instrument of Java
- History of Caklempong

== Sources ==
- Fraser, Jennifer A. Gongs and Pop Songs: Sounding Minangkabau in Indonesia. Ohio University Press. 2015.
- Roth, A. R. New Compositions for Javanese Gamelan. University of Durham, Doctoral Thesis, 1986
