= Funkot =

Music genre

- Other names: Funky kota; hardfunk; house kota; Indonesian house; Indonesian hardcore
- Stylistic origins: House; dangdut; EDM; techno; Eurodance
- Cultural origins: Early 1990s (big cities in Indonesia)
- Typical instruments: Sampler; cowbell; synthesizer; bass drum; DAW; keyboard; turntable

Subgenres
- Dangdut House (Note: Some media also say that Dangdut House is a sub-genre of Dangdut); Breakbeat Kota

Regional scenes
- Indonesia; Japan

Funkot (an abbreviation from Funky Kota) is an electronic dance music genre from Indonesia that emerged in the 1990s. Funkot is a mix of House music with a tempo of 160 to 220 bpm (beats per minute). Many other names exist for this genre, namely "Hardfunk", "House Kota", "Indonesian House", and "Indonesian Hardcore".

== History ==
Funkot was born in 1990 by a music group from Indonesia, Barakatak. Barakatak was initially recruited by Doel Sumbang, a Sundanese musician from West Java, hence, Barakatak made Sundanese music. However, Barakatak changed their genre to House after moving to Jakarta and working with Rony Loan. They were invited to a discotheque in Jakarta called Diskotik Zodiak, where they tried to take drugs (No anti-narcotics law exist yet in Indonesia at that time). This influenced them to attempt making music with new lyrics and musical styles. They came up with a song titled Musiknya Asyik, inspired by the sensation of taking drugs (previously titled Sudah or Belum?). This song is regarded as the origin of Funkot music, which became popular in the country.

== Characteristics ==
Funkot music is a mix of Funky House (Note: Kebanyakan media berita mengatakan bahwa musik Funkot merupakan percampuran House dan Dangdut. Namun ada juga media berita yang mengatakan bahwa Funkot berasal dari percampuran Happy Hardcore (sebuah sub-genre dari Techno) dan Dangdut) and Dangdut music, with a tempo of around 160 to 220 bpm. Funkot music usually includes percussion sounds such as cowbells, woodblocks, fast triple bass kicks, vocal samples (namely "ay!", "are you ready?", and "one, two, three, four" samples), the extensive use of Amen breaks, and high-pitched synths. Most of Funkot's music are a result of remixing and sampling from other popular music in Indonesia. Remix and music sampling are also included in one song or even more than one song in one Funkot music piece. According to DJ Jet Baron, Funkot is similar to Wa Euro, a music genre that is a mix of J-Pop and Italo Disco. The difference is in the tempo and rhythm.

== Sub-genres ==
=== Dangdut House ===
In the 2000s, with the popularity of dangdut koplo, a wave of koplo songs with funkot influence has emerged, such as Cinta Satu Malam. This fusion of dangdut koplo with funkot led to a change in funkot's image, which was previously associated with house music. Funkot became considered as dangdut music by many, although funkot and dangdut are regarded as distinct genres.

=== Breakbeat Kota ===
Breakbeat Kota (commonly referred to as Breakbeat Indonesia, Breakbeat Indo, or Indonesian Breakbeat) is a sub-genre of Funkot that emerged in the 2010s. Although in fact, the use of the term "Breakbeat" in this genre of music overlaps with the notion of Breakbeat that developed earlier in the United States. (Note: See: Breakbeat) The difference between this genre and normal Funkot lies in the tempo, which is not as fast as Funkot, with a 4/4 (4/4) signature and a tempo of 130 bpm.

This genre has become controversial, considering that most of Breakbeat Kota is made by taking samples of other music without permission, and it also contains lyrics that are not suitable for all ages. An example is the song "Aisyah Jatuh Cinta pada Jamilah", which samples the song "Blame" from Calvin Harris and Miley Cyrus' "Wrecking Ball". The composer of the song remains unknown as of 2019.

== Popularity in Japan ==
In 2009, a DJ from Japan, Katsumi Takano (DJ Jet Baron), searched for dangdut music on YouTube. While searching, he stumbled upon Funkot. Interested in Funkot's music, he then went to Bali and met Makoto, a DJ from Japan, a Top Ten DJ music school manager named Christ who is also in Bali, as well as a DJ from Indonesia named Jockie Saputra. Takano learned Funkot from them. Takano then tried to popularize Funkot music in Japan, either when playing as a DJ with his own works mixed into Funkot music, or by mixing other works assembled into Funkot music. As a result, Funkot is now popular in Japan and Takano is called the pioneer of Japanese Funkot music.

== See also ==
- Budots
- Electronic dance music
- Nightclub
- DJ
