= Orkes Gumarang =

Indonesian musical group

Orkes Gumarang (English: Gumarang Band) was a pioneering group in the Indonesian music industry active from the 1950s until the 1970s. The musicians were Minangkabau people, from West Sumatra, but recorded their music in Jakarta, far from their cultural heartland.

Their music is commonly referred to as Sumatran Mambo, because the style is based on that of Latin/Cuban Mambo music with influences from Minangkabau music.

The band was formed in late 1953 in Jakarta, by Alidir, Anwar Anif (leader), Dhira Suhud, Joesfar Khairudin, Taufik, Syaiful Nawas, Awaludin Djamin, Julius Bahri, Hasmanan, and Azwar. The band's name is derived from the famous Minang legend 'Kaba Cindua Mato', Gumarang being a magical horse owned by Cindua Mato.

Anwar Anif has only led for about six months, and then replace by Alidir. The band gained exposure through play on Radio Republik Indonesia (RRI), the state broadcaster, Alidir's band having successfully passed the audition required for play. Minang music was already being played on the 'Penghibur Hati' show ('Entertainment from the heart'), and it was planned that the group would exploit this.

In May 1955, Alidir, the band's leader, was replaced by Asbon Madjid. Asbon remained the band's leader until his death from liver disease in 1980. Also joining were pianist Januar Arifin, singer Nurseha, and Anas Yusuf. Both Asbon and Januar brought Latin styles to the group. The group performed not only on RRI, but also at the Jakarta Arts Building, State Palace and the Istora Senayan.

The band's performances at RRI were recorded by state record label Lokananta, but later private label Irama poached the group. The band interpreted Minang songs, some composed by the group as well as others. Their success inspired three further Minang orchestras, Zaenal Arifin's Zaenal Combo, Oslan Husein's Teruna Ria, and Nuskan Syarif's Kumbang Tjari, these three groups backed most Indonesian singers of the 1960s.

== Discography (partial) ==
- Ondeh no Jiang (Lokananta ARI 001)
- (Lokananta ARI 037)
- Kampung Nan Djauh Di Mata (Irama LPI 17510)
- Bapisah Bukanjo Batjarai (Life Records LMLP 122)
- Laruik Sandjo
- Lagu Gumarang Jang Terkenal (Mesra Records)
- Gumarang '71
- Pintjuran Tudjuah (Lokananta AD028 78 rpm w/Tities & Desy Idris)
- Oi Kampuang (Irama 78 rpm w/Juni Amir)
- Marina (Mesra MS3 78 rpm w/Juni Amir)
- Jo Mai Oi (Mutiara MA12 w/Anas Jusuf)
- Arak ka auar (Mesra 6 w/Sjaiful Nawas)
