= Dangdut =

Genre of Indonesian folk and traditional popular music

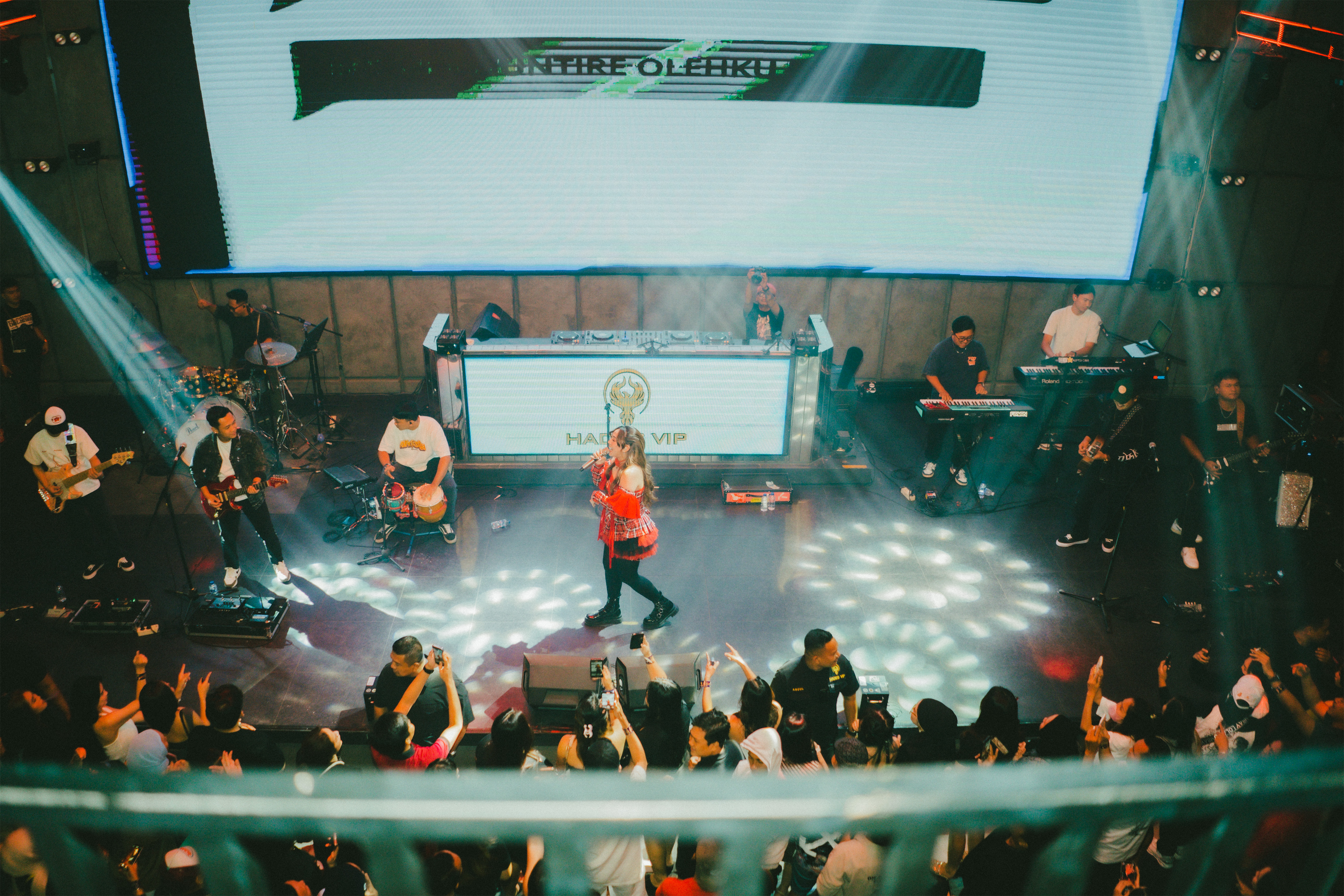
- Dangdut performance by Happy Asmara and Royal Crown Music ensemble, 2025
- Native name: Musik dangdut
- Stylistic origins: Hindustani; Arabic; Javanese; Malay; Minangkabau; Jaipong
- Cultural origins: late 1960s, Java, Indonesia

Subgenres
- Dangdut koplo (East Java, Central Java and Yogyakarta); Dangdut bajidor or Dangdut jaipong (West Java, Jakarta and Banten); Dangdut sunda (Parahyangan, West Java); Dangdut gondang (North Sumatra); Dangdut tarling (Cirebon and Indramayu); Dangdut dendang saluang (West Sumatra); Dangdut pantura (North Coast Java); Dangdut electro (South Sulawesi); Dangdut bumbung (Bali); Dangdut kalimantan (Kalimantan); other regional varieties

Fusion genres
- campursari; congdut (kroncong dangdut); Disco Dangdut; electronic dangdut (e-Dut); funkot; house dangdut; popdut; reggae dangdut; rockdut; rapdut; Hipdut

Regional scenes
- Dangdut in Malaysia

Dangdut (/dɑːŋˈduːt/) is a genre of Indonesian folk music that is partly derived and fused from Hindustani, Arabic, and, to a lesser extent, Javanese, Malay, Minangkabau, Sundanese and local folk music. Dangdut is the most popular musical genre in Indonesia and very popular in other Maritime Southeast Asian countries because of its melodious instrumentation and vocals. Dangdut features a tabla and gendang beat.

Several popular dangdut singers include Rhoma Irama, Mansyur S., Elvy Sukaesih, Camelia Malik, Zaleha Hamid (in Malaysia & Singapore), Rita Sugiarto, and now Iyeth Bustami, Ayu Ting Ting, Lesti Kejora and Via Vallen as Indonesian dangdut divas. Their music includes strong Indian music influences as the basis of harmony, theme, and beat. A dangdut musical group typically consists of a lead singer, backed by four to eight musicians. Instruments usually include a tabla, gendang, flute, mandolin, guitars, sitar, drum machines, and synthesisers. Modern dangdut incorporates influences from Middle Eastern pop music, Western rock, reggae, disco, contemporary R&B, hip-hop, house, and electronic dance music.

The popularity of dangdut peaked in the 1970s and 1980s, but emerged in the late 1960s. By 2012, it was still largely popular in Western Indonesia, but the genre was becoming less popular in the eastern parts, apart from Maluku. Meanwhile, more regional and faster-paced forms of dangdut (as opposed to slower, Bollywood-influenced dangdut) have risen in popularity.

== Development ==
The term dangdut is an onomatopoeia for the sound of the tabla (also known as gendang) drum, which is written dang and ndut. Putu Wijaya initially mentioned in the 27 May 1972 edition of Tempo magazine that the doll song from India was a mixture of Malay songs, desert rhythms, and Indian "dang-ding-dut". It was reportedly coined by the music magazine Aktuil, although Rhoma Irama stated that it was coined as a term of derision by the rich upper class to the music of the poor. Despite its derogatory intent, it was seized upon by those playing it, and the term appears in Rhoma's 1973 dangdut classic.

Dangdut, as a term, branched from a collective sound tradition of the Orkes Melayu ("Malay orchestra") brought by bangsawan performers of Riau to Medan, Jakarta and Surabaya from the 1930s; its genesis can be pointed to heavy incorporation of music from Bollywood films among orkes bands in Jakarta in the 1950s – the films had huge the popularity following Sukarno's embargo on Western music and film during this time. Modern Minangkabau music is also the forerunner of dangdut, along with Malay music.

The transformation of Malay music by M. Mashabi (1932–1967) and Munif Bahasuan (1935–2021) with the Orkes Kelana Ria in the 1960s with several songs such as Ya Mustafa, Ya Mahmud and Patah Kasih which, according to ethnomusicologist Andrew N. Weintraub, are considered "proto-dangdut" and pioneered the form of dangdut as it is known today.

Orkes Melayu singer Ellya Khadam switched to dangdut in the 1970s, and by 1972, she was the number-one artist in Indonesia. Her success, along with that of Rhoma Irama, meant that by 1975, 75 per cent of all recorded music in Indonesia was of the dangdut genre, with pop bands such as Koes Plus adopting the style.

== Culture and controversy ==
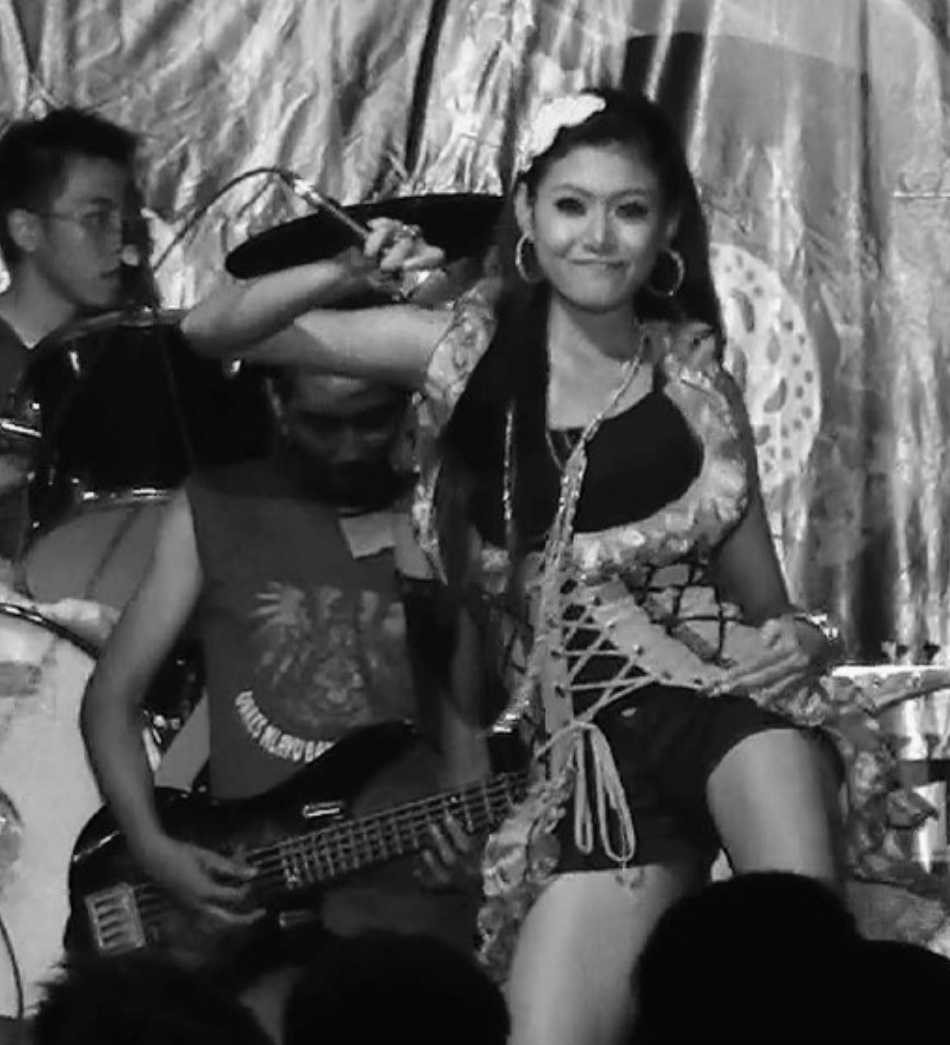
Dangdut band at Purawisata, Yogyakarta, 2011 (from Simon Høeg Jensen's 2012 book)

Dangdut has become "contemporary folk music" in Indonesia. Its popularity surpasses that of other music genres: people love to sing its songs with karaoke, both for themselves and during family celebrations, employees in central government offices exercise to its music before starting work, and so on. Political party campaign stages also do not miss out on utilising the popularity of dangdut to attract the masses.

Most major cities, especially on Java, have one or more venues with a dangdut show several times a week. Concerts of major dangdut stars are also broadcast on television. Because of the genre's popularity, some movies and TV shows have dangdut-centered themes, such as Rhoma Irama's movies and Rudy Soedjarwo's Mendadak Dangdut.

As scholars note, dangdut is the most controversial genre regarding its relation to Indonesian Islamic morality, and few popular music genres around the world are more focused on women's bodies than dangdut, whose lyrics often portray women as sexual objects.

On the one side, within dangdut, a religious current (spiritual dangdut) emerged. While most dangdut songs tell about relationships with boyfriends/girlfriends, spiritual works are directed to God. The main contribution to the emergence of spiritual dangdut was made by Rhoma Irama (albums Hak Azazi, Judi, Takbir Lebaran, Haji, Haram, Baca, and Shalawat Nabi), who made dangdut as a tool for his preaching, which can be seen from the lyrics of the songs he created and from the statements he issued himself.

On the other side, beginning in 2003, certain dangdut musicians became the focus of a national controversy in Indonesia regarding performances by koplo dangdut singer Inul Daratista, which religious conservatives described as erotic and sexually suggestive. Protests led by dangdut megastar and devout Muslim Rhoma Irama called for Daratista to be banned from television, and legislation was passed in 2008 by the People's Consultative Assembly that introduced a broad range of activities described as pornography.

The flamboyant performances at some dangdut shows also attracted collateral attention in May 2012 when a row broke out in Indonesia over a planned performance by international star Lady Gaga in Jakarta due to be held in early June 2012. In the face of opposition from conservative Muslim groups in Indonesia, the planned show was cancelled. This cancellation led numerous commentators to note that opposition to Lady Gaga's performances was surprising given the nature of some dangdut shows.

Dangdut remains an integral part of Indonesian life and pop culture despite conservative Muslim concerns over the supposed vulgarity of some performances (such as by Dewi Persik and Julia Perez).

Due to national laws, dangdut performers seek a balance of perceived womanhood, sexuality, and morality.

== Gallery ==
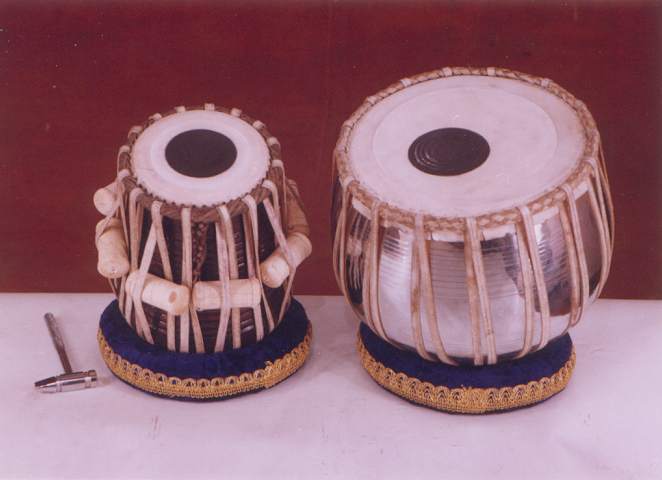
The tabla, one of the most important and main percussion instruments in dangdut

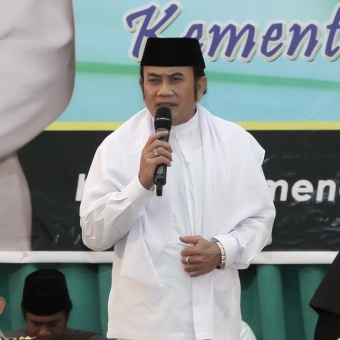
Rhoma Irama, known as "Raja Dangdut" (King of Dangdut) and the pioneer of "spiritual dangdut"

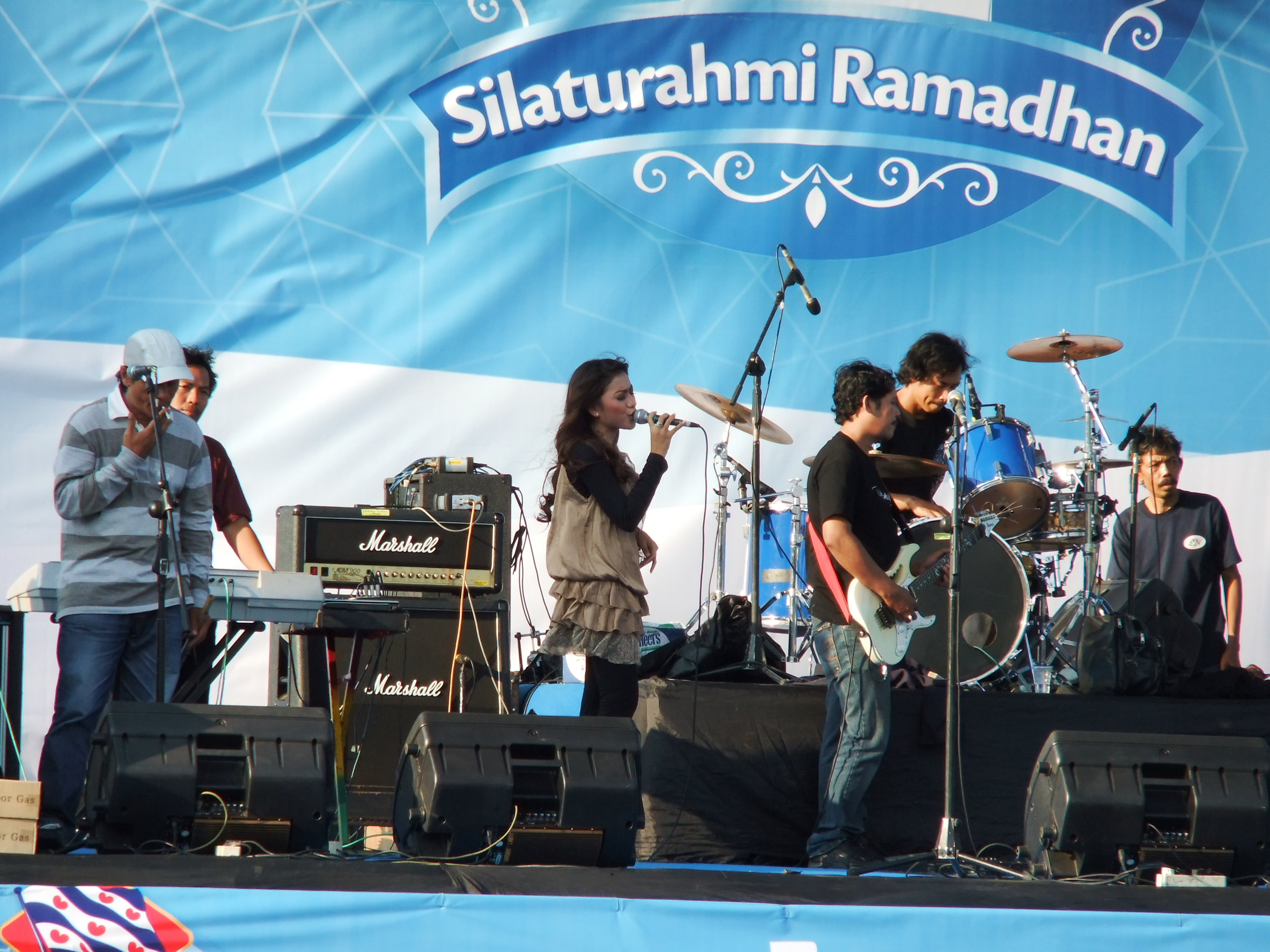
Singer Maya KDI in Surabaya, 2009

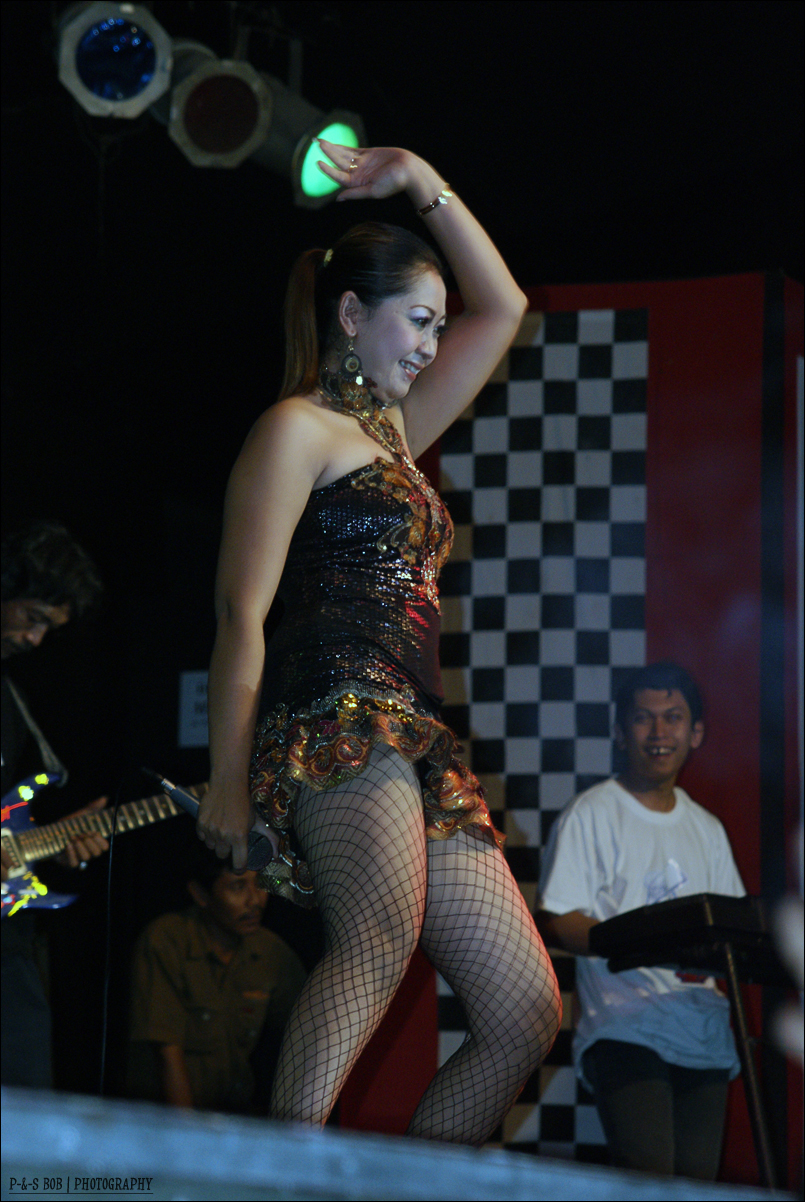
Koplo singer in Yogyakarta

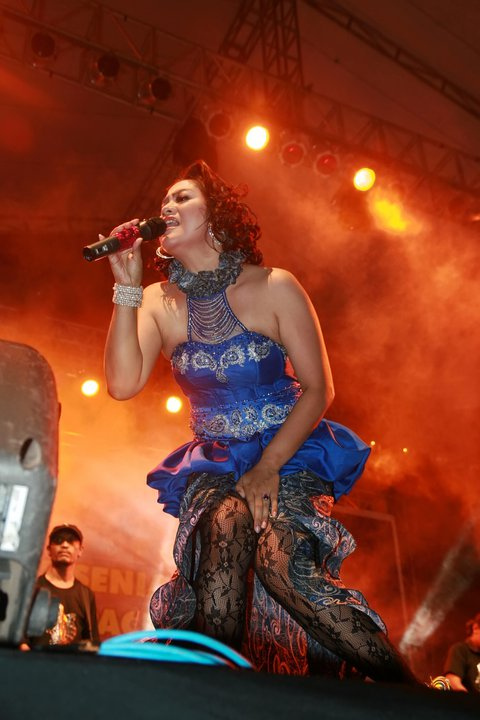
Dangdut singer Yan Vellia in Pacitan, East Java

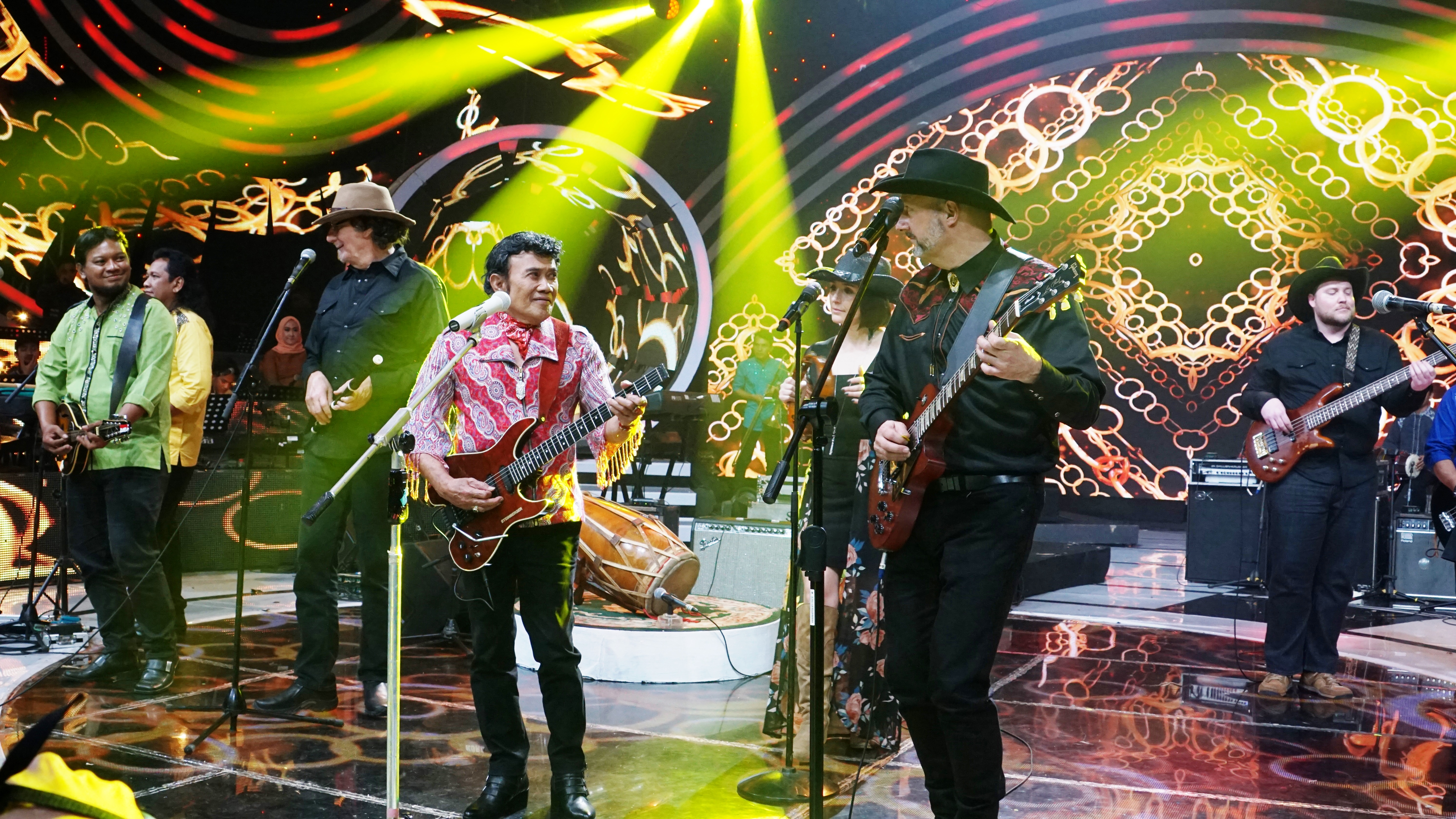
Dangdut Cowboys, dangdut band from Pittsburgh, Pennsylvania

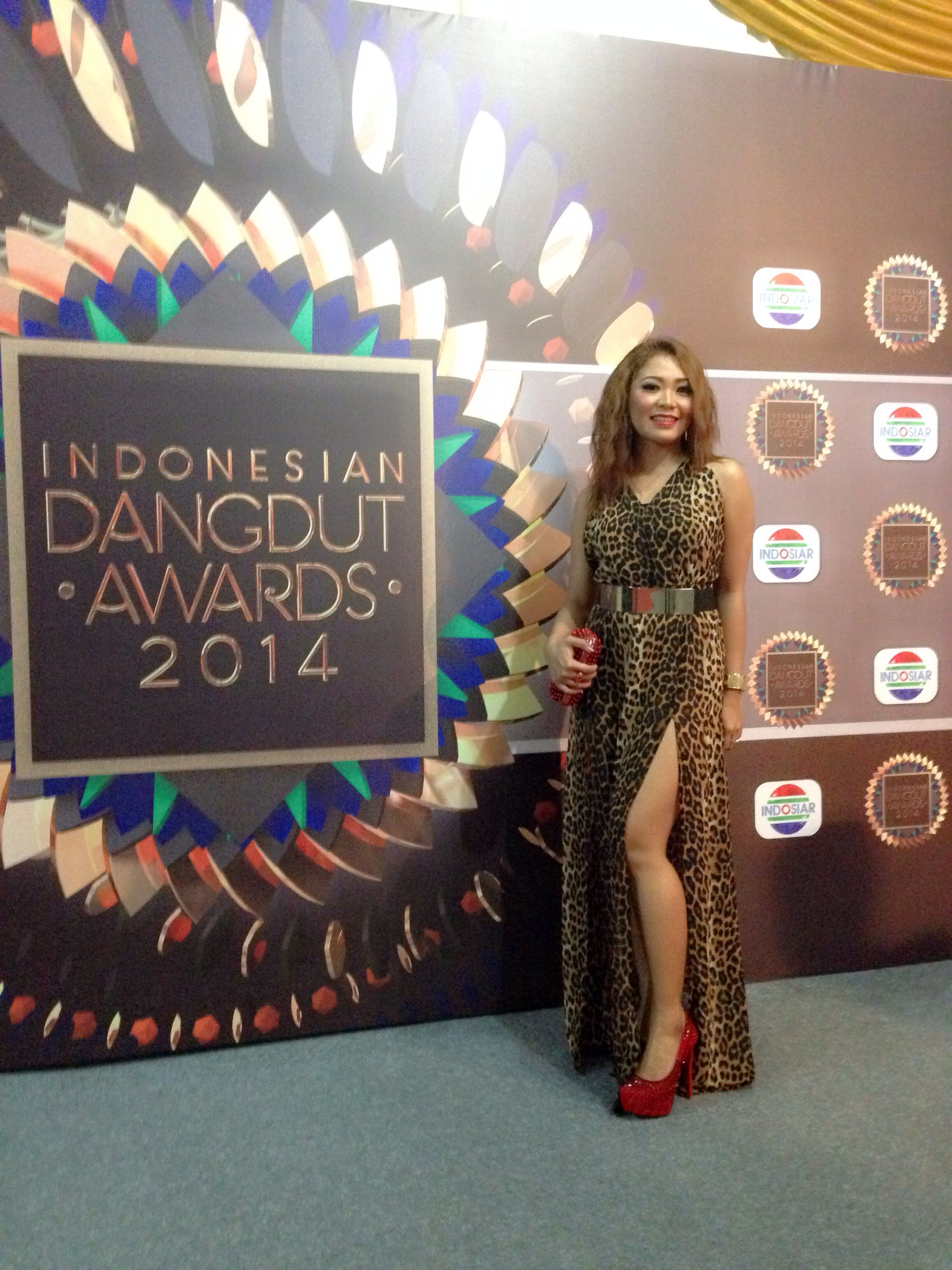
2014 Indonesian Dangdut Awards by Indosiar

== See also ==
- Campursari
- Gambus
- Indo pop
- Music of Indonesia
- Music of Malaysia
