= Dwiki Dharmawan credits =

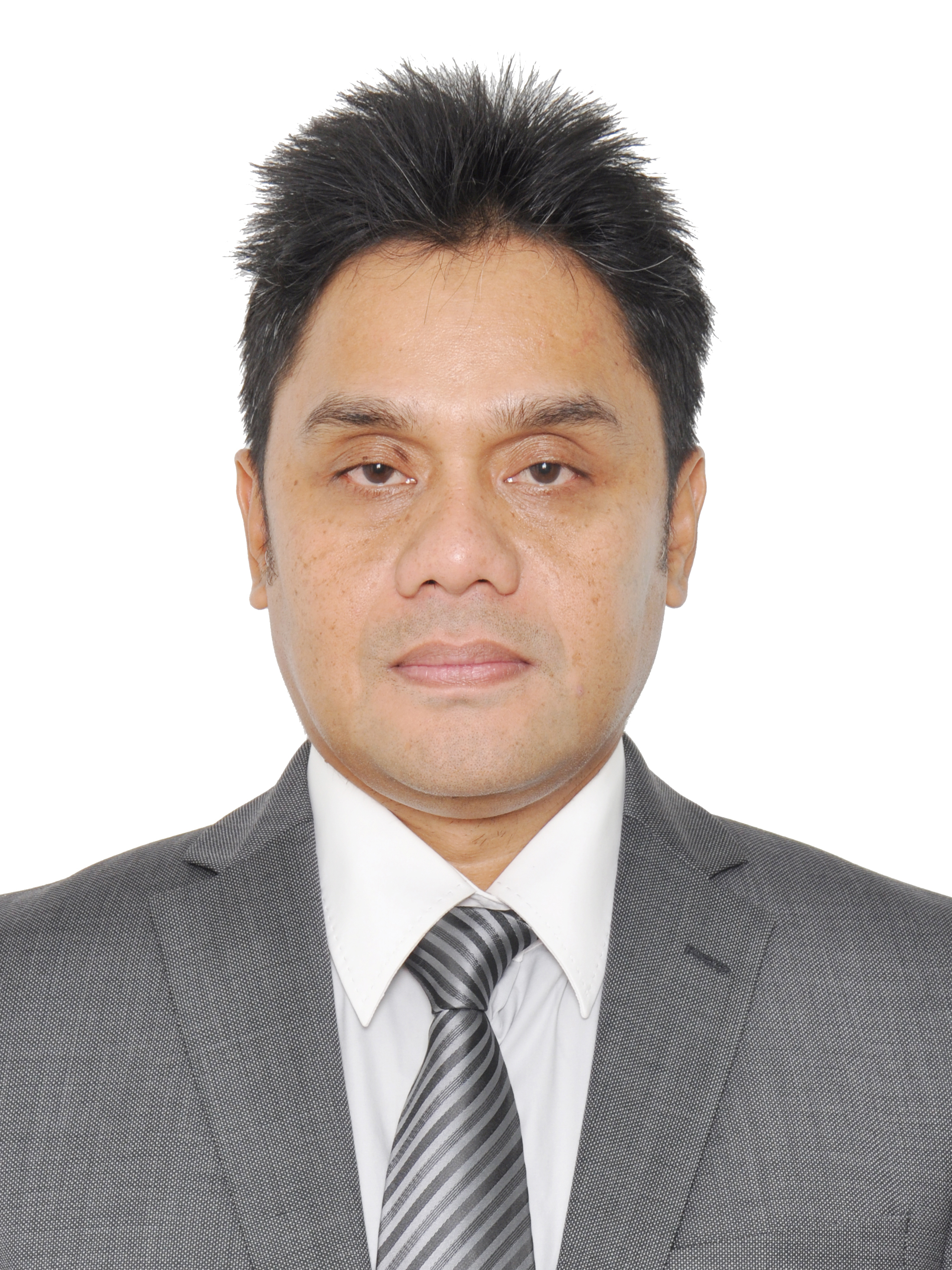
Dwiki in 2013

This is a list of filmography, discography and music video credits by the Indonesian musician and songwriter Dwiki Dharmawan.

== Film ==
| Year | Title | Music composer | Theme music composer | Theme music arranger | Role | Production company | Notes |
|---|---|---|---|---|---|---|---|
| 1990 | Cinta dalam Sepotong Roti | Yes | Yes | Yes | | Prasidi Teta Films; Mutiara Ekanusa Films | Won — 1991 Indonesian Film Festival for Best Original Score |
| 1995 | Regret | No | Yes | No | | Sinemasakini; Global Sarana Media Nusantara; Multi Permai Films | |
| 2000 | Reinkarnasi | Yes | No | No | | Starvision | |
| 2004 | Of Love and Eggs | Yes | No | Yes | | SET Film Workshop | Won — 2005 Bandung Film Festival for Best Original Score |
| 2004 | Angel's Cry | Yes | No | No | | Starvision | |
| 2004 | Ketika | Yes | Yes | Yes | | Citra Sinema | Nominated — 2005 Bandung Film Festival for Best Original Score |
| 2008 | May | Yes | No | Yes | | Flix Pictures | |
| 2008 | Syahadat Cinta | Yes | Yes | Yes | | Piramid Citra Perkasa | |
| 2016 | Ketika Mas Gagah Pergi | Yes | Yes | Yes | Gagah's father | Indobroadcast | |
| 2016 | Jilbab Traveler: Love Sparks in Korea | No | No | Yes | | Rapi Films | Only arranged "Jilbab Traveler". |
| 2017 | A Note to God | No | Yes | No | | Falcon Pictures | Only composed "Dengan Menyebut Nama Allah". Score composed by Andhika Triyadi. |
| 2017 | Duka Sedalam Cinta | Yes | Yes | Yes | Gagah's father | KMGP Pictures | |
| 2018 | Run to the Beach | No | Yes | No | | BASE Entertainment; Ideosource Entertainment; GoStudio Original Productions; Miles Films | Only composed "Gemilang". Score composed by Aksan Sjuman. |
| 2019 | Iqro: My Universe | Yes | Yes | Yes | | Salman Film Academy; Bumi Prasidi Bi-Epsi | |
| 2024 | Lokananta | Yes | No | Yes | Dwiki | AdGlow Pictures; Phicos Productions | |
| 2025 | Hayya 3: Gaza | Yes | No | Yes | | 786 Productions; Warna Pictures | |

== Television ==
| Year | Title | Score composer | Theme music composer | Network | Notes |
|---|---|---|---|---|---|
| 1993 | Pelangi Di Hatiku | Yes | Yes | RCTI | |
| 1994 | Hati Seluas Samudera | Yes | Yes | RCTI | |
| 1994—1997 | Bella Vista | Yes | Yes | RCTI | Score for seasons 1–2 only. Composed "Impian Cinta" for the entire run. |
| 1994—1995 | Deru Debu | Yes | Yes | SCTV | |
| 1995—1996 | Mutiara Cinta | Yes | Yes | RCTI | |
| 1996 | Nikita | Yes | Yes | RCTI | |
| 1996—1997 | Harkat Wanita | Yes | Yes | RCTI | |
| 1997 | Tirai Kasih Yang Terkoyak | Yes | No | RCTI | |
| 1997—1998 | Bidadari Yang Terluka | Yes | Yes | RCTI | |
| 1997—1998 | Melangkah Di Atas Awan | Yes | Yes | Indosiar | |
| 2000 | Kabulkan Doaku | No | Yes | RCTI | Only composed "Dengan Menyebut Nama Allah". Score composed by Dian HP. |
| 2002 | Reinkarnasi: The Series | Yes | No | SCTV | |
| 2007 | Soleha | No | Yes | RCTI | Only composed "Dengan Menyebut Nama Allah". Score composed by Kafka Nafisa. |
| 2017 | Kisah Nyata | No | Yes | Indosiar | Only composed "Dengan Menyebut Nama Allah". |

== Music videos ==
| Year | Title | Artist | Director(s) |
|---|---|---|---|
| 1996 | "KepadaMu Ya Allah" | Ita Purnamasari | —N/a |
| 1999 | "Cintaku" | Chrisye | —N/a |
| 2019 | "Untuk Semesta" | Lana Nitibaskara | Angga Wahyudi |
| 2024 | "KepadaMu Ya Allah" | Ita Purnamasari | Tomi Bongso |
| 2025 | "Dengan Menyebut Nama Allah" | Himself, Jinan Laetitia | Andika Bayu |
| 2025 | "Melangkah Di Atas Awan" | Himself, Dirly Dave | Dinda Anandita, Glenn Rotty |

== Discography ==
Studio albums

- Dwiki Dharmawan (1991)
- Dengan Menyebut Nama Allah (1992)
- Nuansa (2001)
- World Peace Orchestra (2008)
- Menembus Batas (2013)
- So Far So Close (2015)
- Pasar Klewer (2016)
- World Peace Trio (2017)
- Rumah Batu (2018)
- Hari Ketiga (2020)

Compilation album

- Collaborating Harmony: Dwiki Dharmawan (2014)

Soundtrack albums

- The Soundtrack Collection (1994)
- Bella Vista (1994)
- Mutiara Cinta (1995)

== Contributions ==
Works by other artists, featuring guest appearances by Dharmawan. Sorted chronologically.

- "Terpikat" by Djatu Parmawati, included on Tangis Kerinduan (1987; arrangement)
- "Aku Tak Percaya" by Fariz RM, included on Fashionova (1988; arrangement)
- Senyumlah Sayang by Irianti Erningpradja (1989; arrangement)
- "Terlampau Jauh" by Biru Langit, included on ...Ujung Hari (1990; keyboards)
- Virus Cinta by Titiek Puspa (1997; arrangements, keyboards, bass, backing vocals)
