= List of songs by Dwiki Dharmawan =

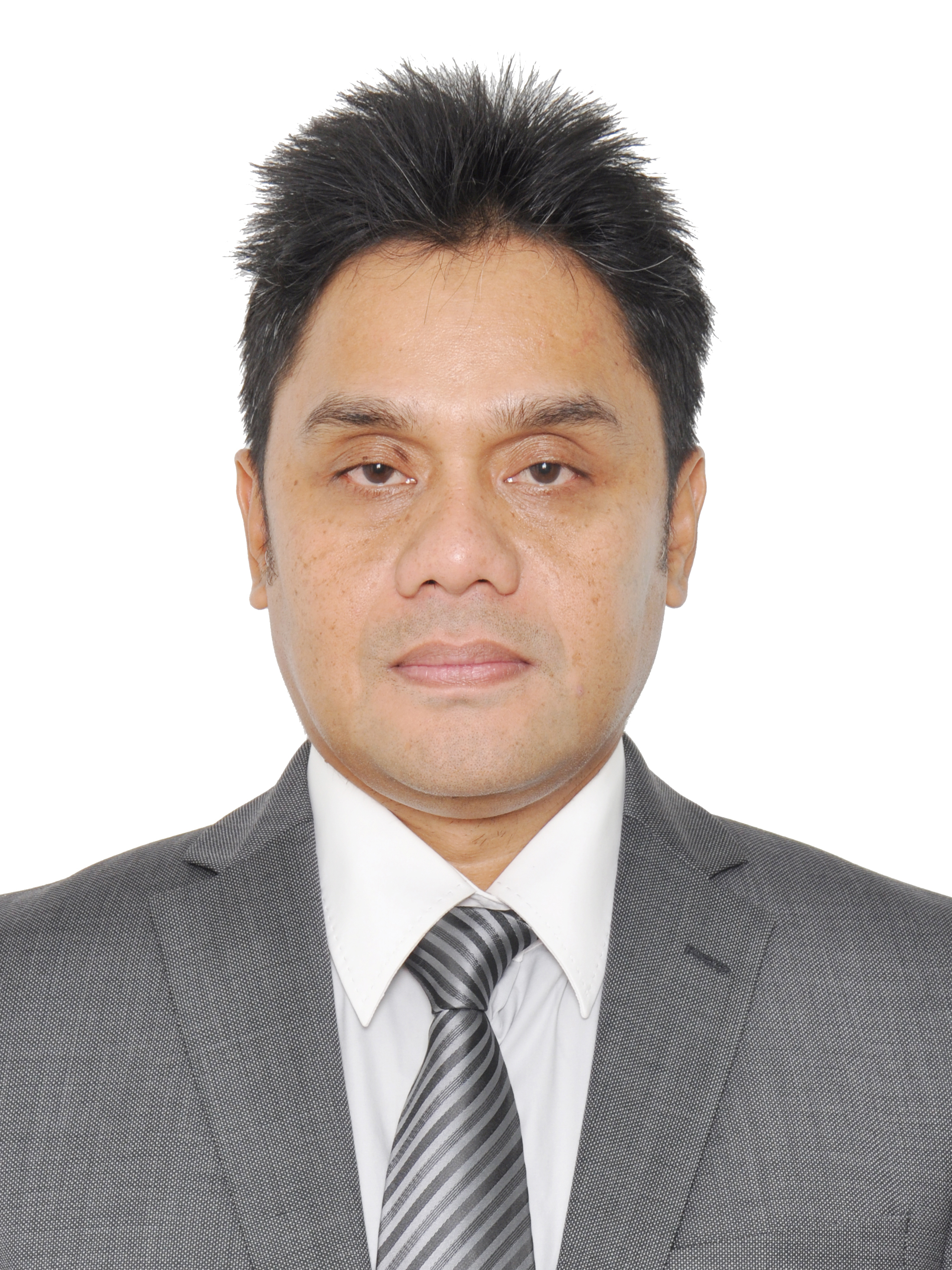
Dwiki Dharmawan in 2013.

During his 40-year career, the Indonesian pop musician and songwriter Dwiki Dharmawan has written or co-written every song, with the exception of some cover versions and guest features. He has also written songs for film and television soundtracks, and songs recorded by other artists. He made his breakout with his song "Gemilang" which he co-wrote with film producer Mira Lesmana, released in the late 1980s.

After the success of "Gemilang", Dwiki wrote his first religious song "Dengan Menyebut Nama Allah" in 1993 for his first special studio album of the same name; the song, performed by Novia Kolopaking that year, became her signature song. As of now, he has written and recorded over 100 songs.

This list includes song titles and their literal English translations, if applicable; song titles that do not need translation but have a possibly unclear meaning have notes after the title. Unless otherwise noted, all songs are in Indonesian.

== Songs ==
Key
†	Indicates single release
‡	Indicates songs written solely by Dwiki Dharmawan
#	Indicates a soundtrack single release

List of songs by name, including featured performers, writers, associated album(s), and release year(s)
Song	Artist(s)	Writer(s)	Album	Year	Ref.
"Akankah?" ("Would It Be?")	Titi DJ	Dani Mamesah; Dwiki Dharmawan; Robin Aristorenas	Dwiki Dharmawan	1991	
"Aku Terus Berjalan" ("I Keep Walking")	Gito Rollies	Ags. Arya Dipayana; Dwiki Dharmawan	Non-album release	1996	
"Asmara" ("Passion")	Sylvana Herman	Dwiki Dharmawan; Raymond Pattirane	Bawa Terbang Aku	1997	
"Banda Neira"	Rita Effendy	Adjie Soetama; Dwiki Dharmawan; Sekar Ayu Asmara	Telah Terbiasa	1994	
"Bebas, Lepas" ("Free")	Amiroez	Amiroez; Dwiki Dharmawan	Dwiki Dharmawan	1991	
"Belumlah Siap Ku Berpisah" ("I Wouldn't Depart Anymore")	Nia Zulkarnaen	Dwiki Dharmawan; Sekar Ayu Asmara	Hanya Padamu	1997	
"Berjaya Di Tanah Legenda" ("Glory in the Land of Legends")	Armand Maulana	Dwiki Dharmawan; Eddy D. Iskandar	Official song of 2016 Pekan Olahraga Nasional	2016	
"Bersama dalam Cinta" ("Together in Love")	Forum	Adi Adrian; Adjie Soetama; Dwiki Dharmawan; Erwin Gutawa; Ingrid Widjanarko; Irianti Erningpraja; Katon Bagaskara; Romulo Radjadin	Bersama dalam Cinta	1997	
"Bersama Kita" ("With Us")	Stanley Sagala	Dwiki Dharmawan; Ical M. Sukarto; Taufik Ismail	Tembang Peduli	1998	
"Bersamamu Selamanya" ("With You Forever")	Nia Zulkarnaen	Dwiki Dharmawan‡	Hanya Padamu	1997	
"Bersyukur PadaNya" ("Thanks to Him")	Ita Purnamasari	Dwiki Dharmawan; Teddy Snada	Spiritual Journey	2015	
"Biarlah Ku Simpan dalam Hati" ("I Let It Keep Inside My Heart")	Rita Effendy	Dwiki Dharmawan‡	2000 Asia Song Festival	2000	
"Bidadari Yang Terluka"† # ("Rage of Angel")	Ita Purnamasari	Dwiki Dharmawan; Eddy D. Iskandar	Theme from Bidadari Yang Terluka	1997	
"Biru Selintas Rindu" ("Blue as Across as Longing")	Utha Likumahuwa	Dwiki Dharmawan; Donny Adoen; Ferina Widodo	1984 Indonesian Pop Song Festival	1984	
"Bosan" ("Ennui")	Vina Panduwinata	Dwiki Dharmawan; Dani Mamesah	Wow!	1988	
"The Bridges"	Dwiki Dharmawan	Dwiki Dharmawan‡	Nuansa	2001	
"Cerita Persahabatan" ("Story of Friendship")	Krakatau	Dwiki Dharmawan‡	Reunion: Chapter One	2016	
"Cinta Kau Telah Datang" ("Love, You Are Here Now")	Gita	Dwiki Dharmawan‡	Rindu-Rindu Asmara	2006	
"Cinta Yang Hilang" ("My Long Lost Love")	Yuni Shara	Dwiki Dharmawan; Lis Magdalin	Kasmaran	1992	
"Cintaku Yang Terakhir" ("My Last Love")	Ita Purnamasari	Dwiki Dharmawan; Sekar Ayu Asmara	Semakin Sayang, Semakin Cinta	1996	
"Cita Pasti" ("Certain Love")	Krakatau	Dwiki Dharmawan; Trie Utami	Krakatau (1988)	1988	
"Cukup Sudah" ("Just Enough")	Gita	Dwiki Dharmawan‡	Rindu-Rindu Asmara	2006	
"Dalam Sujudku"	Ita Purnamasari	Ags. Arya Dipayana; Dwiki Dharmawan	KepadaMu Ya Allah/Dalam Sujudku	1996	
"Dance to Your Roots"	Krakatau	Dwiki Dharmawan; Pra Budi Dharma; Budhy Haryono; Ade Rudiana; Yoyon Dharsono	Mystical Mist	1994	
"Dengan Menyebut Nama Allah"† ("Saying the Name of Allah")	Novia Kolopaking	Dwiki Dharmawan; Ags. Arya Dipayana	Dengan Menyebut Nama Allah	1992	
"Deru Debu"† # ("Thundering Dust")	Ita Purnamasari	Dwiki Dharmawan‡	Main theme of Deru Debu	1994	
"Di Antara Harapan"† ("Between the Wishes")	Dwiki Dharmawan and Irma Basuki	Dwiki Dharmawan; Dani Mamesah	Dwiki Dharmawan	1991	
"Doa" ("The Prayer")	Gita	Dwiki Dharmawan; Sholeh Hasan	Rindu-Rindu Asmara	2006	
"Doa untuk Anakku" ("The Prayer for My Children")	Ita Purnamasari and Dwiki Dharmawan	Luqman Snada	Tembang Lebaran	1998	
"Dua-Duanya" ("Both of Them")	Nia Zulkarnaen	Dwiki Dharmawan‡	Ku Ingin Bersamamu	1994	
"Dua Pertiga Malam" ("Two-Third Nights")	Indah Nevertari	Dwiki Dharmawan‡	Non-album release	2015	
"Dunia" ("The World")	Krakatau	Dwiki Dharmawan; Mira Lesmana	Krakatau (1988)	1988	
"Dzikir Tak Putus-Putusnya"† ("Endless Zikr")	Ita Purnamasari	Dwiki Dharmawan; Taufik Ismail	Menembus Batas	2013	
"Feels like Forever"	Krakatau	Dwiki Dharmawan; Pra Budi Dharma	Kau Datang & Kembali Satu	1990	
"Gemilang"† ("Dazzling")	Krakatau	Dwiki Dharmawan; Mira Lesmana	Krakatau (1987)	1987	
"Gundah" ("Anxiety")	Harry Moekti	Dwiki Dharmawan‡	Tantangan	1988	
"Hai Kembara" ("Welcome Wanderer")	Neno Warisman	Dwiki Dharmawan; Ags. Arya Dipayana	Dengan Menyebut Nama Allah	1992	
"Hari Yang Fitri" ("Eid al-Fitr Day")	Andi Meriem Mattalata	Dwiki Dharmawan; Ags. Arya Dipayana	Tembang Lebaran	1998	
"Hasrat Cintaku" ("My Desire for Love")	Sylvana Herman	Dwiki Dharmawan; Ancha Haiz	Bawa Terbang Aku	1997	
"Hati Seluas Samudra"† # ("The Heart Is as Wide as the Ocean")	Uchy Amyrtha	Dwiki Dharmawan; Ags. Arya Dipayana	Theme song of Hati Seluas Samudera	1994	
"Hati Wanita" ("A Girl's Heart")	Harvey Malaihollo	Dwiki Dharmawan; Eddy D. Iskandar	Sentuhan Kasih	1998	
"Ibunda" ("Mother")	Jopie Latul	Dwiki Dharmawan; Dani Mamesah	Dwiki Dharmawan	1991	
"If Heaven Is Like This"	Krakatau	Dwiki Dharmawan; Pra Budi Dharma	Let There be Life	1992	
"Imaji" ("Image")	Krakatau	Dwiki Dharmawan; Mira Lesmana	Krakatau (1987)	1987	
"Impian Cinta"† # ("Dream of Love")	Iwan Zen and Uchy Amyrtha	Dwiki Dharmawan‡	Theme song of Bella Vista	1994	
"Ingkar" ("Not Promising")	Henry Restoe Putra	Dwiki Dharmawan; Henry Restoe Putra	Restu	1994	
"Inilah Saatnya" ("This Is Our Time")	Krakatau	Dwiki Dharmawan‡	Reunion: Chapter Two	2018	
"Ironis" ("Ironical")	Krakatau	Dwiki Dharmawan; Indra Lesmana; Mira Lesmana	Krakatau (1988)	1988	
"Jabar Gemilang" ("Dazzling West Java")	unknown	Dwiki Dharmawan; Eddy D. Iskandar	Official march of West Java	2011	
"Jadi Rembulan" ("Being Moonlight")	Rita Effendy	Dwiki Dharmawan; Budhy Haryono; Sekar Ayu Asmara	Telah Terbiasa	1994	
"Jalan Menuju Surga" ("Stairway to Heaven")	Aning Katamsi	Dwiki Dharmawan; Taufik Ismail	Menembus Batas	2013	
"Jangan Kau Kira" ("Don't You Think")	Trie Utami	Dwiki Dharmawan; Ags. Arya Dipayana	Dengan Menyebut Nama Allah	1992	
"Janjiku" ("My Pledge")	Mus Mujiono	Dwiki Dharmawan; Amiroez	Dwiki Dharmawan	1991	
"Karma"	Trie Utami	Dwiki Dharmawan; Pra Budi Dharma; Trie Utami	Kekasih Bayangan	2007	
"Kau Datang" ("You Are Here")	Krakatau	Dwiki Dharmawan; Gilang Ramadhan; Pra Budi Dharma	Kau Datang & Kembali Satu	1990	
"Kecuali Dia Sayang" ("Except He Love You")	Rita Effendy	Dwiki Dharmawan; Sekar Ayu Asmara	Saling Setia	1996	
"Kembali" ("Get Back")	Rico Tampatty featuring Ira Wibowo	Dwiki Dharmawan; Rico Tampatty	Playboy	1990	
"Kepada Kesangsian" ("In Witness")	Male Voice	Dwiki Dharmawan; Ags. Arya Dipayana	Dengan Menyebut Nama Allah	1992	
"Keputusanku" ("My Decision")	Neno Warisman	Dwiki Dharmawan‡	Sebuah Obsesi	1988	
"Kerinduanku" ("My Longing")	Sita Nursanti	Dwiki Dharmawan‡	Collaborating Harmony: Dwiki Dharmawan	2013	
"Kesungguhan" ("Reality")	Ancha Haiz and Yovi Muchtar	Dwiki Dharmawan; Dani Mamesah	Theme from Elegi buat Nana	1988	
"Khayal" ("Imagine")	Titi DJ	Dwiki Dharmawan; Mira Lesmana	Ekspresi	1988	
"Kisah Kehidupan" ("Story of My Life")	Asti Asmodiwati	Dwiki Dharmawan; Ags. Arya Dipayana	The Soundtrack Collection: Dwiki Dharmawan	1994	
"Kopi Tubruk" ("Blended Coffee")	Gito Rollies	Dwiki Dharmawan; Djun Saptohadi	The Soundtrack Collection: Dwiki Dharmawan	1994	
"Ku Cinta Kau" ("I Love You")	Rico Tampatty	Dwiki Dharmawan; Dani Mamesah	Playboy	1990	
"Ku Menunggu" ("I'm Waiting")	Ismi Azis	Dwiki Dharmawan‡	Aku Rindu	1994	
"Ku Pasti Kembali" ("I'm Sure to Go Back")	Ita Purnamasari	Dwiki Dharmawan; Ags. Arya Dipayana	Non-album release	1997	
"Ku Temukan" ("I'll Find Out")	Krakatau	Dwiki Dharmawan; Pra Budi Dharma; Budhy Haryono; Ade Rudiana; Yoyon Dharsono	Mystical Mist	1994	
"Ku Temukan CahayaMu" ("I'll Find Your Way")	Stanly	Dwiki Dharmawan; Agus; Ical M. Sukarto	Tembang Lebaran	1998	
"Lamalera's Dream"	Dira Sugandi	Dwiki Dharmawan; Ivan Nestorman	Collaborating Harmony: Dwiki Dharmawan	2010	
"Langkah" ("Walk")	Paramitha Rusady	Dwiki Dharmawan; Paramitha Rusady	Tanpa Dirimu	1990	
"Lepas" ("Getting Out")	Harry Moekti	Dwiki Dharmawan; Oetje F. Tekol	Nona Nona Nona	1990	
"Let There be Life"	Krakatau	Dwiki Dharmawan; Pra Budi Dharma	Let There be Life	1992	
"Liku Kehidupan" ("Acts of My Life")	Chandra Satria	Dwiki Dharmawan; Ags. Arya Dipayana	The Soundtrack Collection: Dwiki Dharmawan	1994	
"Maafkan Aku" ("I'm Sorry")	Ita Purnamasari	Dwiki Dharmawan; Ita Purnamasari	Kembalilah Padaku	1994	
"Maha Pengasih, Maha Penyayang" ("Most Merciful, Most Gracious")	Gito Rollies	Dwiki Dharmawan; Sholeh Hasan	Kembali PadaNya	2007	
"Masa Kecil" ("Childhood")	Katara Singers	Dwiki Dharmawan; Ancha Haiz; Andre Hehanussa	Theme from Cinta dalam Sepotong Roti	1990	
"Masihkah Ada" ("Will You Still Be There")	Ita Purnamasari	Dwiki Dharmawan; Ags. Arya Dipayana	Non-album release	1997	
"Melangkah Di Atas Awan" † # ("Walking in the Clouds")	Ronnie Sianturi	Dwiki Dharmawan; Eddy D. Iskandar	Theme song of Melangkah Di Atas Awan	1997	
"Menanti Datangnya Fajar"† ("Waiting for the Dawn")	Victoria Margareta	Dwiki Dharmawan‡	Nuansa	2001	
"Mencari Cinta Sejati" ("Looking for True Love")	Simhala Avadana	Dwiki Dharmawan‡	Syahadat Cinta	2008	
"Menuju Kemenangan"	Ita Purnamasari	Dwiki Dharmawan; Ags. Arya Dipayana	Non-album song	1996	
"Mutiara Cinta"† # ("Love Pearls")	Pita Loppies	Dwiki Dharmawan‡	Mutiara Cinta	1995	
"Nada Cinta" ("Love Tune")	Prilly and Ian Lubis	Dwiki Dharmawan‡	Mutiara Cinta	1995	
"Nuansa" ("Nuance")	Paramitha Rusady	Dwiki Dharmawan‡	Jatuh Hati	1988	
"Pelangi Di Hatiku"† # ("A Rainbow in My Heart")	Irma Basuki	Dwiki Dharmawan; Piet Subiakto	Theme song of Pelangi Di Hatiku	1993	
"Pena & Tinta" ("The Pen and the Ink")	Ajeng Fajrin	Dwiki Dharmawan; Taufik Ismail	Menembus Batas	2013	
"Pesona Indonesia"	Rossa	Dwiki Dharmawan‡	Jingle of Ministry of Tourism and Creative Economy	2015	
"Pestamu"	Ancha Haiz and Eddie Endoh	Dwiki Dharmawan; Eddie Endoh	Non-album release	1988	
"Playboy"	Rico Tampatty and Jala-Jala	Dwiki Dharmawan; Engkit; James F. Sundah; Rico Tampatty	Playboy	1990	
"Pusing" ("Dizzy")	Atiek CB	Dwiki Dharmawan; Budhy Haryono; Robin Aristorenas	Kharisma Indonesia 2	1987	
"Rinduku" ("My Longing")	Nia Zulkarnaen	Dwiki Dharmawan; Nia Zulkarnaen	Hanya Padamu	1997	
"Rintak Rebana"	Dwiki Dharmawan	Dwiki Dharmawan‡	Nuansa & Rumah Batu	2001 & 2018	
"Saat Ku Sendiri" ("When I'm Alone")	Rico Tampatty	Dwiki Dharmawan; Rico Tampatty; Robin Aristorenas	Playboy	1990	
"Sampai Di Sini" ("Right Here")	Gita	Dwiki Dharmawan‡	Rindu-Rindu Asmara	2006	
"Saskia, Antara Cinta dan Dusta" ("Saskia, Between Love and Lies")	Rico Tampatty	Dwiki Dharmawan; Dani Mamesah	Playboy	1990	
"Satu Kembali" ("Back Together")	Krakatau	Dwiki Dharmawan; Budhy Haryono; Pra Budi Dharma	Let There be Life	1992	
"Sayangi Aku, Aisyah"† # ("Love Me, Aisyah")	Ita Purnamasari	Dwiki Dharmawan‡	Sayangi Aisyah theme song	2005	
"Sekitar Kita" ("Around Us")	Krakatau	Dwiki Dharmawan; Pra Budi Dharma; Trie Utami	Let There be Life	1992	
"Selamat Jalan Kasih" ("Goodbye My Love")	Sylvana Herman	Dwiki Dharmawan; Ita Purnamasari	Bawa Terbang Aku	1997	
"Selamat Datang Ramadan, Selamat Tinggal Corona" ("Hello Ramadan, Bye Bye Corona")	Nasyid Indonesia	Dwiki Dharmawan; Teddy Snada	Non-album release	2020	
"Semalam Ku Dicium" ("You Kissed Me More Last Night")	Rita Effendy	Dwiki Dharmawan; Sekar Ayu Asmara	Saling Setia	1996	
"Sia-Sia Ku Menunggu"	Dwiki Dharmawan	Dwiki Dharmawan; Toto Tasmara	Dwiki Dharmawan	1991	
"Standing in the Rain"	Trie Utami	Dwiki Dharmawan; Pra Budi Dharma	Dwiki Dharmawan	1991	
"Suasana"	Krakatau	Dwiki Dharmawan; Indra Lesmana; Pra Budi Dharma	Kembali Satu	1990	
"Suasana"	Paramitha Rusady	Dwiki Dharmawan; Ancha Haiz; Paramitha Rusady	Tanpa Dirimu	1990	
"Suka Cita" ("Joy")	Chintami Atmanegara	Dwiki Dharmawan‡	Ujung Rambut Ke Ujung Kaki	1988	
"Syahadat Cinta"	Terry	Dwiki Dharmawan‡	Syahadat Cinta	2008	
"Tabir Tercinta" ("Lovely Sunshine")	Harvey Malaihollo	Dwiki Dharmawan; Ferina Widodo	1984 Indonesian Pop Song Festival	1984	
"Tak Ada Rencana" ("No Plan")	Eddie Endoh	Dwiki Dharmawan; Amiroes	Dwiki Dharmawan	1991	
"Tak 'Kan Hatiku Mendua" ("My Heart Won't Seduced")	Ina Rawie	Dwiki Dharmawan; Sekar Ayu Asmara	1995 Pop Song Festival	1995	
"Tak Lagi Sendiri" ("Not Alone Again")	Mus Mujiono	Dwiki Dharmawan; Mira Lesmana	Yang Pertama	1988	
"Tambatkan Aku dalam Hatimu" ("Attend Me in Your Heart")	Rita Effendy	Dwiki Dharmawan; Sekar Ayu Asmara	Telah Terbiasa	1994	
"Tari Latinosia" ("Latinosian Dance")	Trie Utami	Dwiki Dharmawan; Budhy Haryono; Trie Utami	Kekasih Bayangan	2007	
"Taubat"	Snada	Dwiki Dharmawan; Teddy Snada	Di Pintu Langit	2007	
"Tegar" ("Resillient")	Ancha Haiz	Dwiki Dharmawan; Dani Mamesah	Elegi buat Nana	1988	
"Teman Lama" ("Old Friends")	Trie Utami	Dwiki Dharmawan; Irianti Erningpraja	Untuk Ayah Ibu Tercinta/Sesungguhnya	1991	
"Tembang Peduli" ("Song of Awareness")	Singers of Tembang Peduli	Dwiki Dharmawan; Ags. Arya Dipayana	Tembang Peduli	1998	
"Ternyata"	Krakatau	Dwiki Dharmawan; Pra Budi Dharma	Let There be Life	1992	
"Terumbu Menangis"	Krakatau	Dwiki Dharmawan; Trie Utami	Reunion: Chapter Two	2018	
"Tiada Abadi" ("Nothing Eternal")	Krakatau	Dwiki Dharmawan; Indra Lesmana; Mira Lesmana	Krakatau (1988)	1988	
"Tiada Lagi Keraguan" † # ("No More Doubts")	Trie Utami	Dwiki Dharmawan; Dani Mamesah	Elegi buat Nana	1988	
"Tiada Yang Melebihi" ("Nothing Excessive")	Ita Purnamasari	Dwiki Dharmawan; Ags. Arya Dipayana	Cintamu	2002	
"Tiga Kata" ("Three Words")	Asti Asmodiwati	Dwiki Dharmawan; Asti Asmodiwati; Budhy	Asti	1992	
"Together We Inspire the World"	Reza Artamevia	Dwiki Dharmawan; J. Leonard	2008 Asian Beach Games official song	2008	
"The Truth"	Dwiki Dharmawan	Dwiki Dharmawan; Mira Lesmana	The Soundtrack Collection: Dwiki Dharmawan	1994	
"Tuhan Maha Penyayang" ("God of Most Gracious")	Nia Zulkarnaen	Dwiki Dharmawan; Sekar Ayu Asmara	Tembang Lebaran	1998	
"Undangan Tuhan" ("Invitation of God")	Ajeng Fajrin	Dwiki Dharmawan; Taufik Ismail	Menembus Batas	2013	
"Untuk Kamu" ("For You")	Ria Irawan	Dwiki Dharmawan; Deddy Dhukun	Untuk Kamu	1992	
"Untuk Semesta"† # ("Only My Universe")	Lana Nitibaskara	Dwiki Dharmawan; Mirelda Hartadi; Tyas Abiprasanti	Soundtrack from Iqro: My Universe	2019	
"Untuk Sesama Kita" ("For All of Us")	Krakatau	Dwiki Dharmawan; Pra Budi Dharma	Let There be Life	1992	
"We Are Many We Are One"	Dira Sugandi	Dwiki Dharmawan; Ivan Nestorman	Theme from Ring of Fire Adventure	2012	
"Wonderful Indonesia" (Note: English version of "Pesona Indonesia")	Rossa	Dwiki Dharmawan‡	Jingle of Ministry of Tourism and Creative Economy	2015	

== See also ==
- Dwiki Dharmawan credits
- List of artists who have covered Dwiki Dharmawan songs
