= Indo pop =

Indonesian pop music

Indonesian pop
- Other names: I-pop
- Stylistic origins: Indonesian folk music; country; pop; rock
- Cultural origins: 1960s, Indonesia
- Typical instruments: Vocals, acoustic guitar, electric bass, electric guitar, drum, keyboards, piano, violin, harmonica, synthesizer, ukulele

Subgenres
- Pop melayu

Fusion genres
- Senja

Regional scenes
- Pop Jawa; Pop Bali; Pop Sunda; Pop Minang

Other topics
- Indonesian rock; dangdut; Indonesian hip-hop; pop melankolis; pop kreatif

Indo pop (Indonesian: Pop Indo), also known as Indonesian pop (Indonesian: Pop Indonesia) or I-pop, is loosely defined as Indonesian pop music; however, in a wider sense, it can also encompass Indonesian pop culture, which also includes Indonesian cinema and sinetrons (Indonesian television series).

Indonesian pop music today is sometimes influenced by trends and recordings from Western music. However, in return, the Indonesian style of pop music has influenced the regional pop culture in Southeast Asia, especially the Malaysian pop scene that began imitating the Indonesian style of pop music in the late 2000s. Indo pop usually expresses contemporary Indonesian sentiments and lifestyles, generally about love and social life related to relationships. Indonesian pop music with sad and mellow melodies is popular and sells well.

== History ==
One of the earliest form of Indonesian pop can be traced back to Orkes Melayu ("Malay orchestra") bands in Medan starting in the 1930s to its peak in 1950s Jakarta and Surabaya mishmashing musical traditions of bangsawan theatre from the Riau Islands with Indian and Arabic influences filtered through Western instrumentation. The Jakarta stream especially took heavy influences from Bollywood laying the groundwork for a branching new genre named dangdut.

=== 1960s–1970s ===
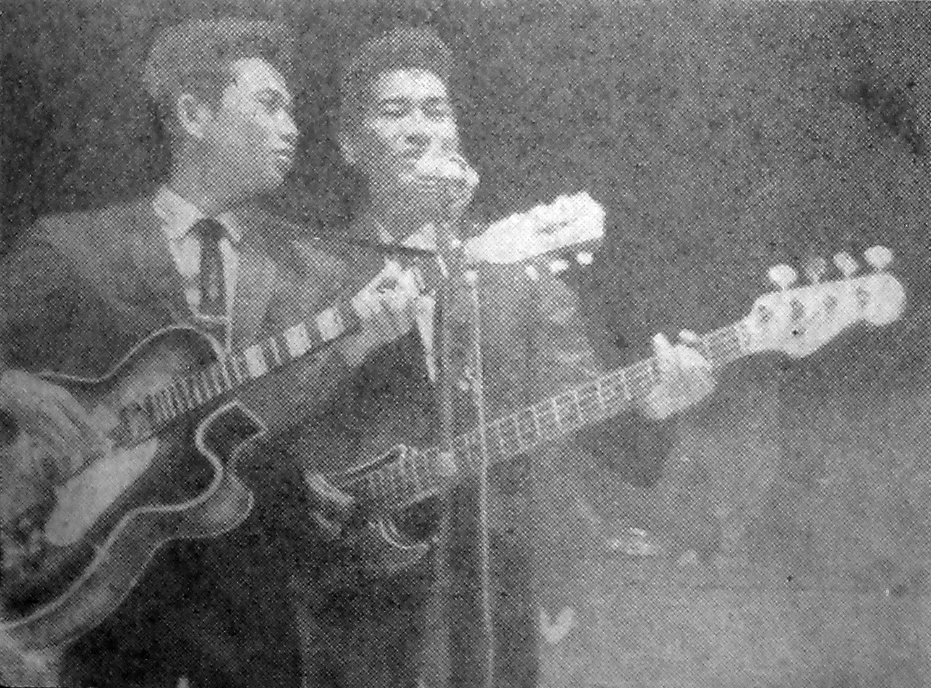
Koes Plus, one of the pioneer of Indonesian pop music

Koes Plus, formerly called Koes Bersaudara, is considered one of the pioneers of Indonesian pop and rock 'n roll music in the 1960s and 1970s. American and British music influences were obvious in the music of Koes Plus; the Beatles were known to be the main influences of this band.

Indonesian pop music in the 1970s also gave rise to musicians and singers such as Chrisye, Titiek Puspa, and Ebiet G. Ade. Their work in the country's music industry was large, influencing the development of music after that. These names are still stuck in the minds of many because they are the pioneers of pop music in this country. The popularity of these artists also crossed over to neighbouring Malaysian airwaves and its own popular music as well.

The Indonesian music industry in the 1970s was quite advanced, and the pop music genre became very popular, featuring works from musicians like Chrisye, Ade, and Puspa. The Prambors (LCLR) songwriting competition in 1977 broke the stagnation in the pop music industry at that time. This event also gave birth to many new musicians in the following years.

=== 1970s–1980s: Pop Melankolis and Pop Kreatif genres ===
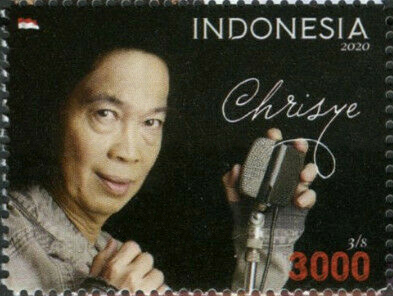
Postage stamp dedicated to Chrisye. Widely regarded as one of the most influential figure in Indonesian pop music for his contributions in 70's‒2000's music genres

During the late 1970s and through the 1980s, two subgenres of Indonesian pop dominated the local industry: melancholic pop and Pop Kreatif. Melancholic pop, also known as weepy song, is characterised by a slow tempo, sentimental themes often touching domestic settings and influences from 1950s American traditional pop, incorporating elementary chord progressions. Prominent composers in this subgenre included Rinto Harahap. Pance Pondaag and Obbie Messakh. Popular melancholic pop singers included Dian Piesesha (whose album Tak Ingin Sendiri sold over 2 million copies), Nia Daniaty, Iis Sugianto, Iis Sugiarti, Nani Sugianto, and Betharia Sonatha (whose album Hati yang Luka became a major hit in 1987). This subgenre was briefly banned from being broadcast on TVRI in 1988 by Harmoko, Indonesia's then Minister of Information.

In contrast, Pop Kreatif, often referred to as Indonesian City Pop by modern audiences, is characterised by its upbeat tempo and AOR influences, with elements of funk, new wave, jazz fusion, disco, and boogie comparable to Japanese city pop and jazz fusion. This subgenre was particularly associated with urbanites and the leisure class. Popular singers and composers in this subgenre included Chrisye, Fariz RM, KLa Project, Utha Likumahuwa, and Vina Panduwinata. The successes of the Badai Pasti Berlalu soundtrack and Fariz RM's album Sakura became a momentum for the growth of city pop. After the Harmoko ban on melancholic pop from being broadcast on TVRI in 1988, Pop Kreatif gradually became more popular with the masses, dominating from the late 1980s until 1990, when Malaysian slow rock/rock kapak began to seep into Indonesian pop culture.

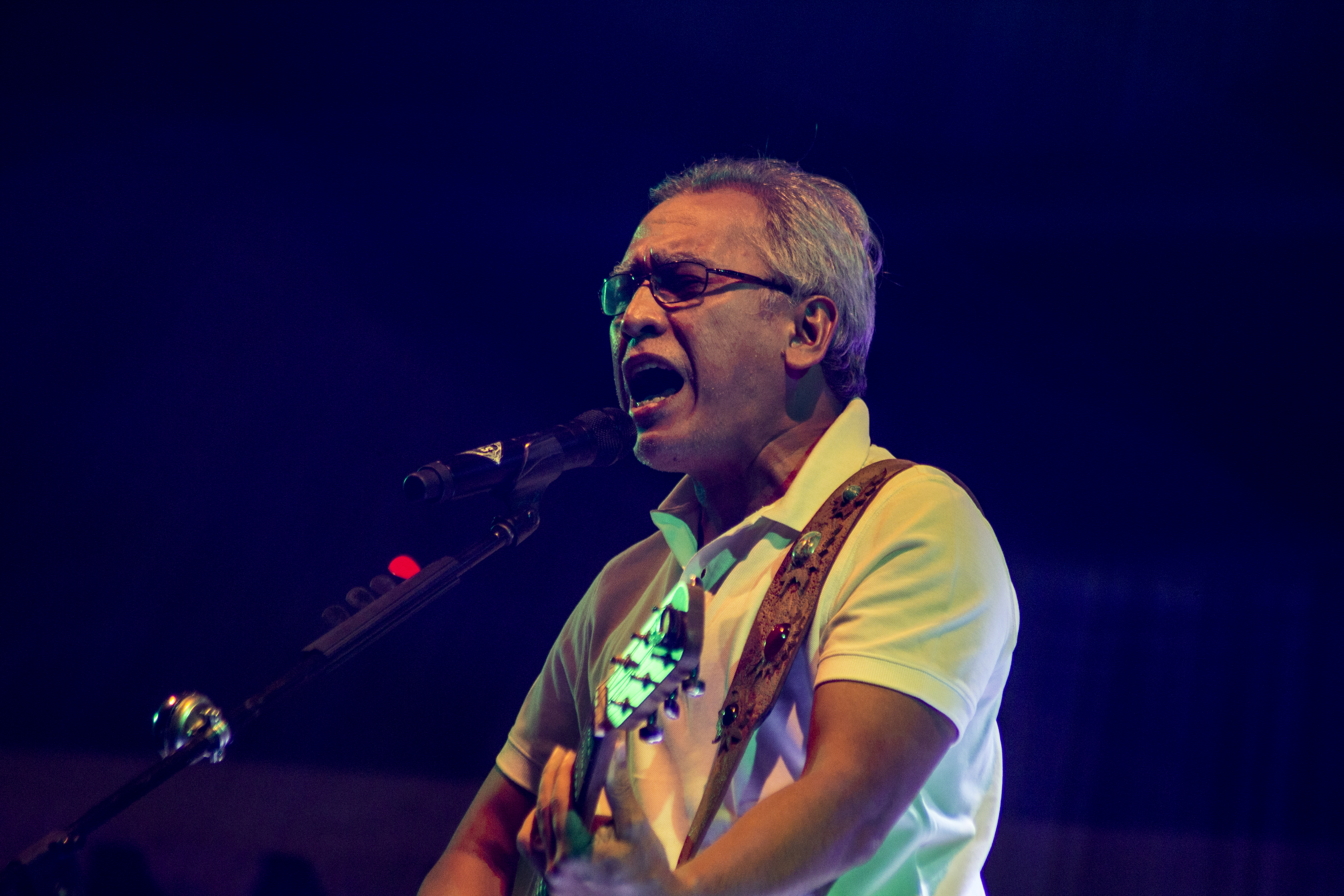
Iwan Fals, a legendary Indonesian musician who raises many social and political issues in his music

Iwan Fals was very popular at that time, and his music is still a favourite of many people. The songs are quite political; they raise many issues, such as war ("Puing"), the environment ("Isi Rimba Tak Ada Tempat Berpijak Lagi"), poverty ("Siang Sebrang Istana"), and child labour ("Sore Tugu Pancoran"). The songs often criticise the government. Some of his songs were banned by the authoritarian Suharto government at that time.

=== 1980s–1990s: Pop groups ===
In the late 1980s, boy bands and girl groups began to emerge. The first boy band to debut in Indonesia was Trio Libels, which consisted of Ronnie Sianturi, Yanni and Edwin Manansang. This was followed by the first wave or generation of boy bands, girl groups and co-ed groups. Several notable groups that emerged from this wave are the Cool Colors, Coboy, M.E., T-Five, Warna, Rida Sita Dewi, AB Three, and Bening.

=== 2000s–2010s: Pop rock and East Asian influences ===
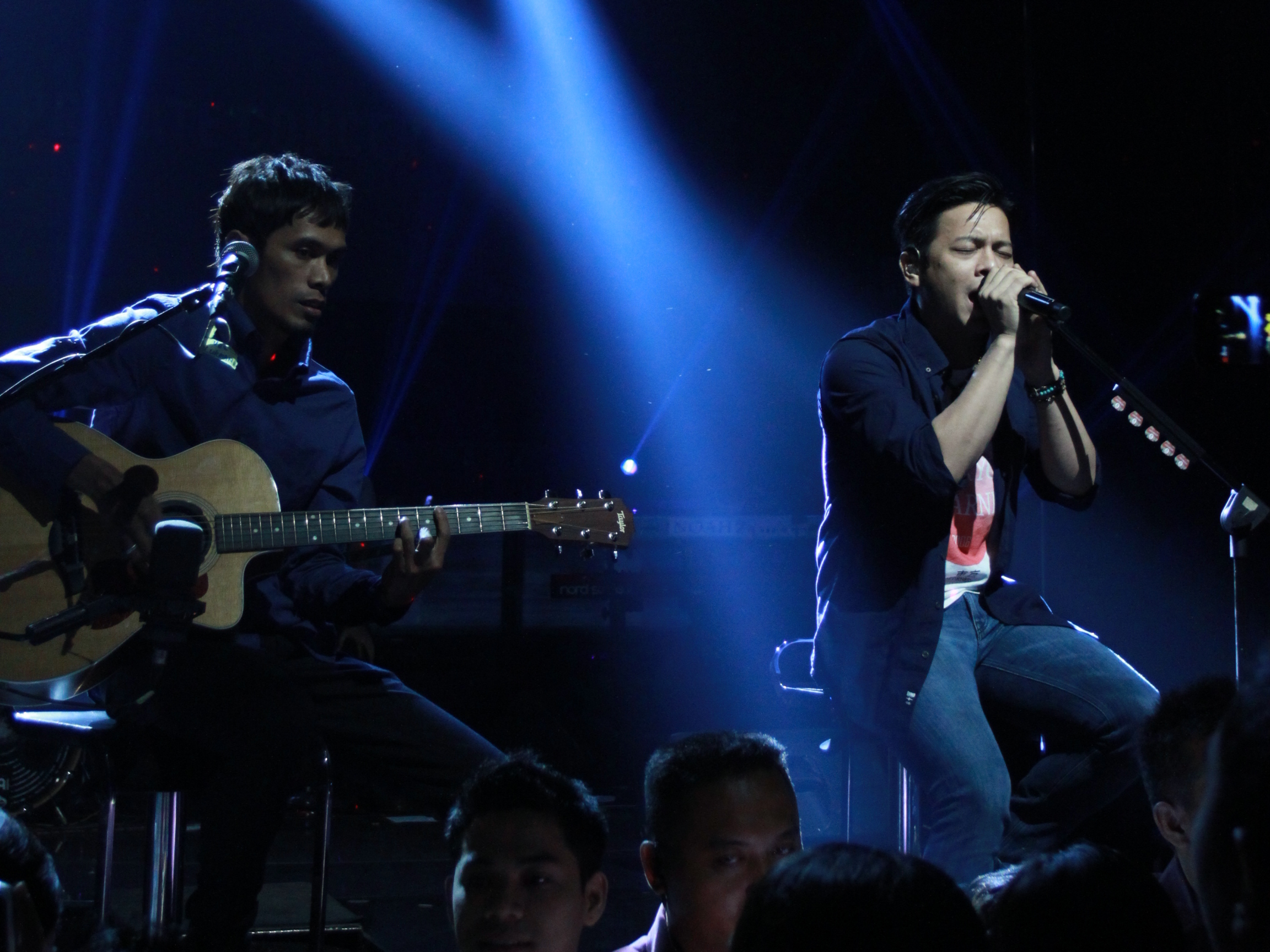
Noah, one of the most popular pop bands in Indonesia

In the 2000s, music with a pop rock style began to dominate the national music charts. Popular bands that use the pop rock concept include Peterpan, Dewa 19, Gigi, Sheila on 7, Padi, Ada Band, Ungu, Letto, Nidji, and D'Masiv, all of which are featured on MTV Asia and tour regularly nationwide plus the neighbouring countries of Singapore and Malaysia. These bands have received immense reception in the region (including Brunei). Some people have attributed this to the neutral shared vocabulary in songwriting compared to the spoken vernaculars between these countries. However, others have speculated that the proliferation of pirated cassettes and CDs is the cause.

The popularity of Indonesian music in Malaysia, in particular, had become so overwhelming that in 2008, demands were made for radio stations to restrict the number of Indonesian songs aired to give local musicians a fairer chance.

Some pop rock bands incorporate traditional Malay roots into their sound, reviving the old Orkes Melayu style once popular in Indonesia and Malaysia. Such bands belong to the "Band Pop Melayu" Malay pop subgenre, which became popular in the late 2000s with acts like Kangen Band, Wali, Hijau Daun, Armada, Angkasa, and ST 12.

Indonesia first experienced the Korean wave in the 2000s, leading to the popularisation of K-dramas and K-pop. The rising popularity of K-pop gave rise to a second wave or generation of boy bands and girl groups in Indonesia. Several K-pop-influenced groups emerged from this wave, one of the earliest being G-String, but the most notable are SM*SH, CJR and Cherrybelle. Other popular groups include 7Icons, XO-IX, Hitz, and Dragonboyz. It is from this era that the term "I-pop" emerged and was used by several groups, including Cherrybelle, 7Icons, and XO-IX.

Several J-pop-influenced groups also debuted around the same time. In 2011, Super Girlies, a J-pop-influenced girl group, debuted; their first single is a cover of a Berryz Kobo song. That same year, the Japanese idol group AKB48 launched its first sister group in Jakarta, JKT48. JKT48 introduced the "idols you can meet" concept in Indonesia and distinguished itself from other groups by calling themselves an idol group rather than a "girlband" particularly. Subsequently, several independent J-pop-influenced "idol groups" made their debuts, including Lumina Scarlet (LuSca), which debuted in 2012.

== Connection with Indonesian films and television series ==
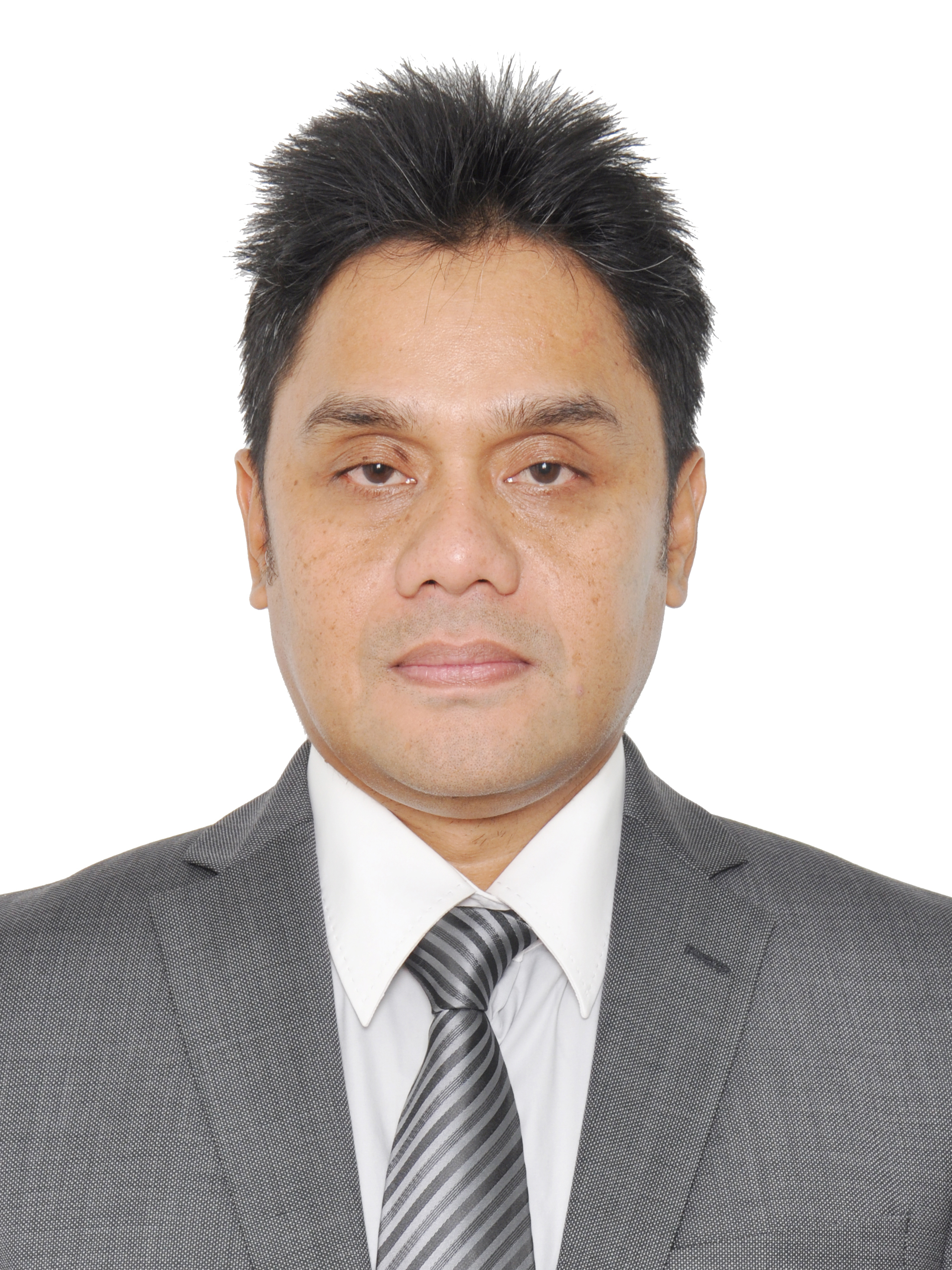
Musician, songwriter and record producer Dwiki Dharmawan became a prominent figure in soundtracks of television series in the 1990s.

Indonesian films and television series are strongly connected to Indonesian music. Most Indonesian films and television series feature soundtracks consisting primarily of Indonesian music, generally Indonesian pop and occasionally rock.

Dwiki Dharmawan is an Indonesian musician, songwriter and record producer known for some of his musical works that are related to soundtracks in Indonesian films and television series. He rose to fame through his arrangement of "Aku Ingin" ("I Want"), composed by Ags. Arya Dipayana with lyrics by Sapardi Djoko Damono for the film Cinta dalam Sepotong Roti (Love in a Slice of Bread) in 1990.

Later, Dwiki wrote the theme songs for the television series Bella Vista (1994), Harkat Wanita (A Woman's Trait, 1996) and Bidadari Yang Terluka (A Wounded Angel, 1997). The theme song for Bidadari Yang Terluka was popular and was performed by Ita Purnamasari, Dwiki's wife.

Melly Goeslaw is an Indonesian musician and female solo singer known for her many musical works related to soundtracks in Indonesian films and television series. She made her debut in making soundtracks for teen drama films in 2002 with the film What's Up with Love? (Ada Apa Dengan Cinta?), in which most of the songs were sung by her and written by her and her husband.

Goeslaw then provided the soundtrack for the films Eiffel... I'm in Love in 2003, Apa Artinya Cinta? (What Love Means) in 2005, Heart in 2006, The Butterfly in 2007 and Ketika Cinta Bertasbih (When Love Prays) in 2009. For Ketika Cinta Bertasbih, Goeslaw considered writing the film's theme song more difficult than her previous works in teen romance films because it is a religious film.

Her works in these films made Goeslaw increasingly popular as a soundtrack musician, earning her the nickname Queen of Soundtrack. The soundtrack for What's Up with Love? later won Best Soundtrack at the 2004 Indonesian Film Festival.

== International popularity ==
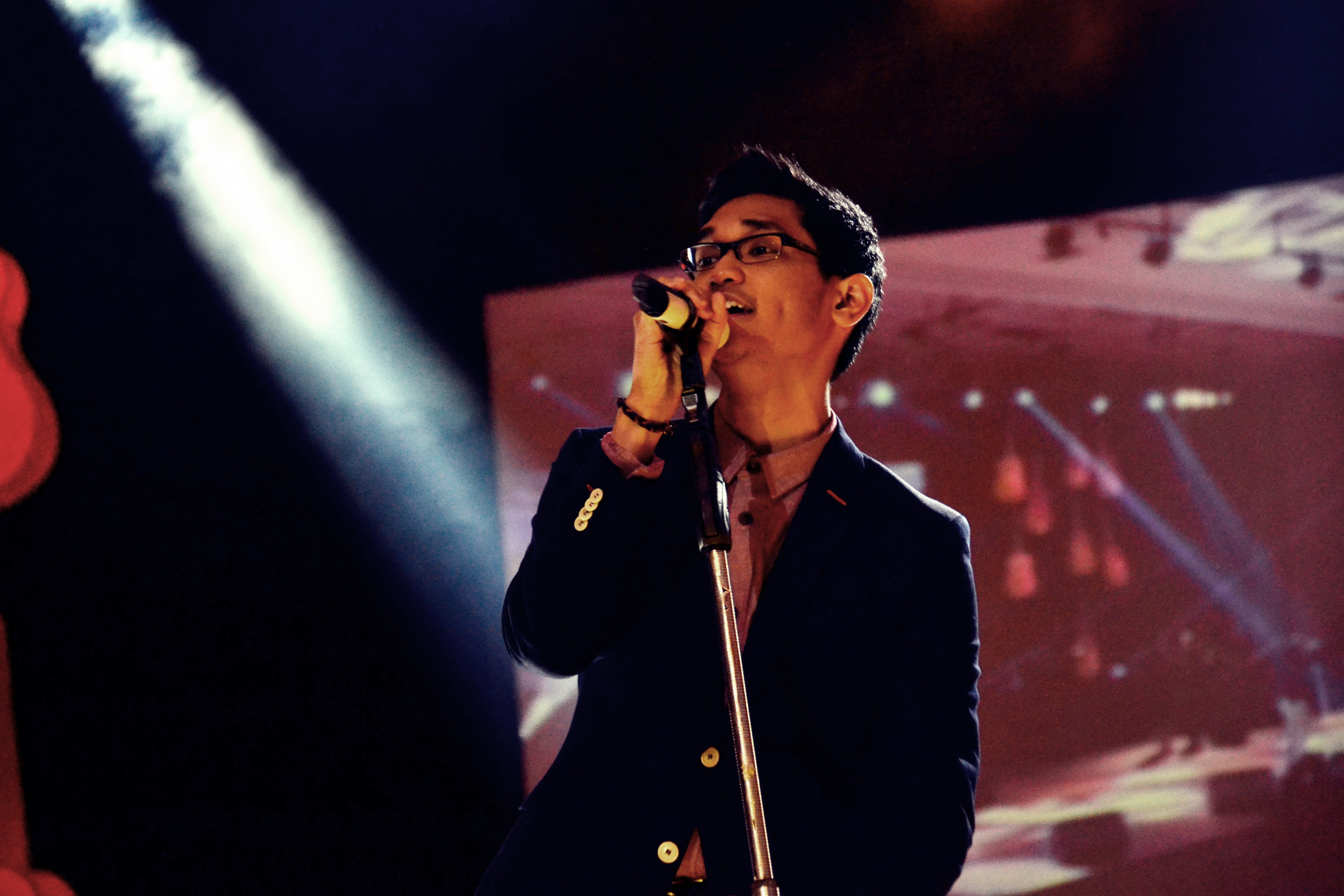
Afgan performing in 2013

The popularity of Indonesian pop music is high among Malay-speaking countries which Indonesia is also considered together (region commonly described as the Nusantara). The wider coverage is only for ASEAN countries such as the Philippines, Vietnam, and Cambodia. Singers such as Agnez Mo have been gaining popularity even outside said Nusantara region like Vietnam, Sri Lanka, Cambodia, and the Philippines.

The 2018 single "Heaven" by Afgan, Isyana Sarasvati, and Rendy Pandugo, became popular in Indonesia, Taiwan, Vietnam, and Sri Lanka, reaching the top 10 in all four countries.

In 2018, the official theme song for the 2018 Asian Games, "Meraih Bintang", performed by pop dangdut singer Via Vallen, became viral in numerous countries across Asia and beyond. Many singers performed translated covers of the song in their respective languages, uploading the videos on YouTube.

Nevertheless, prominent Indonesian musicians such as Rich Brian, NIKI, Stephanie Poetri, Weird Genius, Indahkus and Rainych have acquired recognition internationally between 2018 and 2023. They are primarily associated with international record labels and represent the rise of Indo pop in international popularity.

== See also ==
- List of Indonesian pop musicians
- Anugerah Planet Muzik - music awards event held between Singapore, Malaysia and Indonesia
- Indonesian rock
- Indonesian hip-hop
- Pop melayu
- Dangdut
- Campursari
