= List of artists who have covered Dwiki Dharmawan songs =

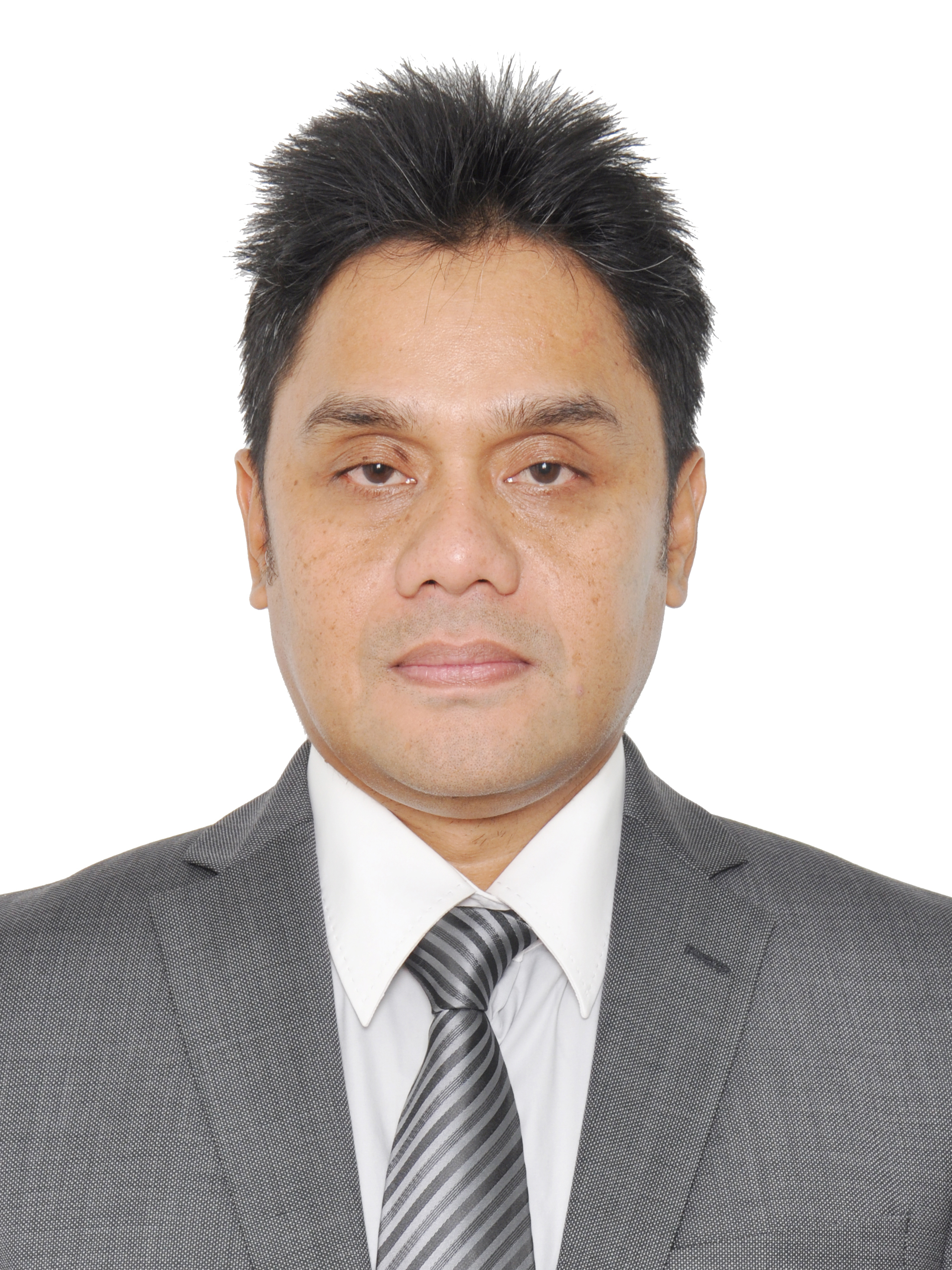
Dharmawan in 2013

Dwiki Dharmawan is an Indonesian songwriter, musician and record producer who has been a major figure in popular music for more than four decades. Some major recording artists have covered Dwiki's material, some even increasing a song's popularity as is the case with Alex Rudiart's cover of "Melangkah Di Atas Awan" and Ita Purnamasari's version of "Taubat".

== Key ==
Denotes Dwiki Dharmawan related tribute
Indicates a cover version not released as a standalone single or part of an album

== Selection ==
List of select artists who have covered Dwiki Dharmawan songs, showing artist, year, title and appearances
Artist	Year	Title	Appearance(s)	Ref.
Ify Alyssa	2010	"Lamalera's Dream"	2010 Java Jazz Festival	
Andien	2010	"Gemilang"	Kirana	
Andini	2017	"Dengan Menyebut Nama Allah"	25 Senandung Islami	
Mikha Angelo	2013	"Sekitar Kita"	Collaborating Harmony: Dwiki Dharmawan	
Nindy Ayunda	2014	"Hati Seluas Samudra"	Collaborating Harmony: Dwiki Dharmawan	
Dalagita	2014	"Biru Selintas Rindu"	Collaborating Harmony: Dwiki Dharmawan	
The Dream Band finalists	2005	"Gemilang"	Dream Band 2005	
Rita Effendy; Agus Wisman	1996	"Dengan Menyebut Nama Allah"	Semesta Tuhan	
Marina Elsera	1994	"Pelangi Di Hatiku"	The Soundtrack Collection	
Ajeng Fajrin	2013	"Pena & Tinta"	Menembus Batas	
Iwan Fals	2018	"Gemilang"	Iwan Fals and Band's Situs Budaya Concert	
Rida Farida	2011	"Dengan Menyebut Nama Allah"	Dengan Menyebut Nama Allah	
Gigi	2004	"Dengan Menyebut Nama Allah"	Raihlah Kemenangan	
Nathalie Holscher	2021	"Dengan Menyebut Nama Allah"	Non-album single	
Aning Katamsi	2023	"Taubat"	Menembus Batas	
Shena Malsiana	2013	"Imaji"	Collaborating Harmony: Dwiki Dharmawan	
Marshanda	2007	"Dengan Menyebut Nama Allah"	Dua Belas Lagu Islami Terbaik 3	
Miss Indonesia finalists	2015	"Gemilang"	2015 Miss Indonesia	
Lana Nitibaskara	2014	"Dengan Menyebut Nama Allah"	Collaborating Harmony: Dwiki Dharmawan	
Ikke Nurjanah	2002	"Dengan Menyebut Nama Allah"	Lebaran Bersama Ikke Nurjanah	
OMG; XO-IX	2014	"We Are Many We Are One"	Collaborating Harmony: Dwiki Dharmawan	
Ita Purnamasari	1997	"Dengan Menyebut Nama Allah"	Non-album release	
Ita Purnamasari	2013	"Dzikir Tak Putus-Putusnya"	Non-album release	
Ita Purnamasari	2015	"Taubat"	Spiritual Journey	
Didi Rachman	2000	"Sia-Sia Ku Menunggu" (Note: Released as "Menanti (Sia-Sia Ku Menunggu)".)	Milikku	
RAN	2018	"Gemilang"	Run to the Beach	
Alex Rudiart	2014	"Melangkah Di Atas Awan"	Collaborating Harmony: Dwiki Dharmawan	
Chandra Satria	1994	"Tabir Tercinta"	Bella Vista	
Margareth Siagian	2014	"Deru Debu"	Collaborating Harmony: Dwiki Dharmawan	
Nagita Slavina	2019	"Dengan Menyebut Nama Allah"	Non-album single	
Warna	1998	"Dengan Menyebut Nama Allah"	Tembang Lebaran	
XO-IX	2014	"Sia-Sia Ku Menunggu"	Collaborating Harmony: Dwiki Dharmawan	
Iwan Zen	1994	"Biru Selintas Rindu"	Bella Vista	

== See also ==
- List of songs by Dwiki Dharmawan
