= Surat Kecil untuk Tuhan (soundtrack) =

2017 soundtrack album by the Purwa Caraka Music Studio Choir

Soundtrack album by the Purwa Caraka Music Studio Choir
- Released: 19 May 2017
- Recorded: April–May 2017
- Studios: Delapan, Gandaria, Jakarta
- Genres: Children's; choral
- Length: 19:58
- Label: Falcon

Surat Kecil untuk Tuhan is the soundtrack album to the 2017 Falcon Pictures film of the same name. Directed by Fajar Bustomi, the film featured children's songs reinterpreted with treble voice arrangements by Fero Aldiansya Stefanus and performed by the Purwa Caraka Music Studio Choir, conducted by Jessica Fedora Amadea. The soundtrack won the Best Children's Album at 2017 AMI Awards ceremony.

The lead single "Suka Hati" was released on 28 April, a few weeks before the album, alongside its music video. A full soundtrack album was released by Falcon Music on 19 May, a month before the film's release, and was curated to represent Anton and Angel's childhood.

== Production ==
=== Background ===
This soundtrack album was announced in April 2017. Frederica states that the modern-day children listen to English songs, so she actually tried to "reimagining" children's songs in a new style.

=== Recording ===
The album was recorded at the Delapan Studio and 168 Studio in early 2017. The Purwa Caraka Music Studio Choir performed all of the songs for the film, marking their first collaboration with Falcon Pictures. In the soundtrack session, the director Fajar Bustomi felt its songs "heartwarming" and "nostalgic", when appearing in the film, it brings the majestic ambience. The lead single "Suka Hati" was released on 28 April, a few weeks before the album, alongside its music video.

== Additional music ==
In addition to choral adaptations of popular Indonesian children's songs, Surat Kecil untuk Tuhan also features a cover of the religious song "Dengan Menyebut Nama Allah", written by Dwiki Dharmawan and Ags Arya Dipayana, rearranged by Fero Aldiansya Stefanus and Syahrier Helmy with choral adaptations by Fero. This version was performed by the Purwa Caraka Music Studio Choir, but not included in the soundtrack or separately released.

== Track listing ==
All tracks are orchestrated by Fero Aldiansya Stefanus and Syahrier Helmy, except track 4 orchestrated by Andhika Triyadi. Tracks 4 and 5 are left out of the film.

Standard edition
No.	Title	Writer(s)	Length
1.	"Ambilkan Bulan" ("Bring Me the Moon")	A. T. Mahmud	3:16
2.	"Bintang Kecil" ("Little Star")	Daljono	3:36
3.	"Nina Bobo" ("Lullaby")	N.N.	4:02
4.	"Suka Hati" ("If You're Happy and You Know It"; film version)	N.N.	3:07
5.	"Suka Hati" ("If You're Happy and You Know It")	N.N.	3:13
6.	"Tik-Tik Bunyi Hujan" ("Rain Song")	Ibu Sud	2:46
Total length:			19:58

Extra song in the film but not the soundtrack album
No.	Title	Writer(s)	Length
1.	"Dengan Menyebut Nama Allah" ("In the Name of Allah")	Dwiki Dharmawan; Ags Arya Dipayana	3:45

== Accolades ==
At the 2017 AMI Awards, Surat Kecil untuk Tuhan won the Best Children's Album, losing other nominees including the Lovely Kids for Bandar Udara. The lead single, "Suka Hati" was nominated for Best Pop Vocal Ensemble, while it won the Best Children's Duo, Group, Vocal Ensemble or Collaboration.

== Personnel ==
Personnels adapted from album's liner notes.

=== Studio ===
- Recorded at Delapan Studio, Gandaria

=== Vocalists ===
- Amelia Angeliqa Hadinata
- Diva Aurora Wijaya
- Catlin Michaela Hermawan
- Raihana Nabila
- Florentina Resa Kawatu
- Eliyah Bertinaz
- Yohana Angelica
- Azka Nadiya
- Levinia Hadinata
- Andini Sekar
- Gizka Aulia
- Nadya Andini
- Salshabilla Tasya

=== Production and technical ===
- Fero Aldiansyah Stefanus – choral arrangement (all tracks), music arrangement (all tracks except 4)
- Syahrier Helmy – music arrangement (all tracks except 4), orchestration
- Andhika Triyadi – music arrangement (track 4)
- Ade Omar – mastering
- Indra Qadarsih – mixing
- Pandunara – recording
- Jessica Fedora Amadea – vocal directing
- Devi Susilawati – production management
- Sahila Rahmi – production management assistant

== Release history ==
Date	Format(s)	Label
19 May 2017	CD; Digital download; streaming	Falcon
