= Collaborating Harmony: Dwiki Dharmawan =

2014 tribute album by Dwiki Dharmawan and various artists

Compilation album by Dwiki Dharmawan and various artists
- Released: 6 February 2014
- Recorded: 2013–2014
- Genre: Indo pop; teen pop; jazz; rock; orchestral
- Length: 50:53
- Language: Indonesian; English
- Label: Sony

Dwiki Dharmawan chronology
Menembus Batas (2013)	Collaborating Harmony: Dwiki Dharmawan (2014)	So Far So Close (2015)

Singles from Collaborating Harmony: Dwiki Dharmawan
- 1. "Imaji" Released: 11 December 2013

Collaborating Harmony: Dwiki Dharmawan (occasionally referred just as Collaborating Harmony) is the first tribute album by Indonesian musician and songwriter Dwiki Dharmawan. It was released digitally by Sony Music Indonesia on 6 February 2014, almost a year after his special album, Menembus Batas. Created as part of his thirtieth anniversary celebration, the album was inspired by Dwiki's musical journey in Indonesian music over the years and consists of twelve tracks that are mostly remakes of Dwiki's songs, along with the new song "Kerinduanku". Sony Indonesia's founder Jan Djuhana served as the album's executive producer, with Badai, Erwin Bragi, Tanto of the Groove, Tito P. Soenardi and others contributed production.

The tribute album was announced on 9 December 2013. Musically, it is primarily a pop record with elements of teen pop, jazz fusion, rock, and orchestral music. The album was preceded by the lead single "Imaji" sung by Shena Malsiana, which previously released on 11 December 2013. A physical version of the album was released on 25 February 2014 to generally positive reviews from critics, who complimented its fresh arrangement and interaction with the "new generation" singers and music directors.

== Background ==
On 9 December 2013, during the conference at RCTI Kebon Jeruk Studio, it was reported that Alex Rudiart and Shena Malsiana involved on a then-upcoming compilation album with a then-unknown arranger and musician, which was later confirmed to be Dwiki Dharmawan. Shortly after, Dwiki began explaining which music genre heard by teenagers and younger children. The title Collaborating Harmony describes Dwiki's musical journey in Indonesian music for the last three decades. From most of his songs, twelve of them are chosen to be sung by young singers. The album originally consists of thirty tracks, then shrunk to twenty as an official from Sony Music Jan Djuhana announced them and finally reduced to ten in which representing songs' harmony and theme, including songs by Krakatau and television drama theme songs. He also wrote and self-arranged the new song, "Kerinduanku" ("My Longing"), and remakes of his previously written English-language songs, "Lamalera's Dream" and "We Are Many We Are One". It was preceded by the album's lead single and title track "Imaji" ("Image") sung by Shena Malsiana, released on 11 December 2013, which received positive reviews, including its rearrangement. The album itself released digitally on 6 February, followed by the physical release on 25 February.

== Production ==
To produce Collaborating Harmony, Dwiki enlisted new collaborators to fit in with modern-day Indonesian music, such as songwriter Badai and young singers, including singer Shena Malsiana performing "Imaji", Mikha Angelo of Overtunes performing "Sekitar Kita", Dalagita performing "Biru Selintas Rindu", child actress Lana Nitibaskara performing "Dengan Menyebut Nama Allah" and Alex Rudiart performing "Melangkah Di Atas Awan". Sonically, this album adopted more of the "teen pop musical trends", (Note: Original: " ...lebih mengadopsi tren anak muda.") as described by Dwiki.

== Reception ==
Collaborating Harmony received generally positive reviews upon its release. Sapto Purnomo of Liputan 6 wrote that this album "brings up the fresh concept", with some of his previous songs reinterpreted with "a modern-day style".

== Track listing ==
All music is composed by Dwiki Dharmawan, with tracks 2, 3 and 6 are respectively co-written by Donny, Pra Budi Dharma and Toto Tasmara.

No.	Title	Lyrics	Performed by	Length
1.	"Imaji" ("Image"; originally by Krakatau)	Mira Lesmana	Shena Malsiana	4:05
2.	"Biru Selintas Rindu" ("Love is blue"; originally by Utha Likumahuwa)	Donny Adoen; Ferina Widodo	Dalagita	4:17
3.	"Sekitar Kita" ("Around us"; originally by Krakatau)	Trie Utami	Mikha Angelo	4:05
4.	"Hati Seluas Samudra" ("The heart is as wide as an ocean"; originally by Uchy Amyrtha)	Ags. Arya Dipayana	Nindy Ayunda	4:18
5.	"Dengan Menyebut Nama Allah" ("Saying the name of Allah"; originally by Novia Kolopaking)	Arya Dipayana	Lana Nitibaskara	4:28
6.	"Sia-Sia 'Ku Menunggu" ("I'm so futile to wait"; originally by Dwiki)	Dwiki	XO-IX	4:27
7.	"Deru Debu" ("Thundering dust"; originally by Ita Purnamasari)	Dwiki	Margareth Siagian	3:44
8.	"Melangkah Di Atas Awan" ("A walk in the clouds"; originally by Ronnie Sianturi)	Eddy D. Iskandar	Alex Rudiart	4:28
9.	"Lamalera's Dream"	Ivan Nestorman	Dira Sugandi	5:28
10.	"Bidadari Yang Terluka" ("Rage of angel")	Iskandar	Purnamasari	4:25
11.	"Kerinduanku" ("My longing")	Dwiki	Sita Nursanti	4:03
12.	"We Are Many We Are One"	Nestorman	Nicky Riyant; Kiky; Hesty; Lia	3:03
Total length:				50:53

== Personnel ==
Personnels adapted from album's liner notes.

- Dwiki Dharmawan — composition (all tracks), lyrics (tracks: 7 & 11), arrangements (tracks 9, 11, 12), production
- Doadibadai Hollo — arrangements (tracks: 1, 8), synths (track 1), keyboard (tracks: 1, 8)
- Ronny Koten — drums (track 1)
- Lucky Barus — guitar (track 1)
- Choky Cassandra — bass (track 1)
- Arie Kurniawan — saxophone (track 1)
- Tanto the Groove — arrangements (track 2)
- Erwin Bragi — arrangements (track 3)
- Tito P. Soenardi — arrangements (tracks: 4 & 5)
- Donny Adoen — composition (track 2)
- Pra Budi Dharma — composition (track 3)
- Mira Lesmana — lyrics (track 1)
- Ferina — lyrics (track 2)
- Trie Utami — lyrics (track 3)
- Ags. Arya Dipayana — lyrics (tracks: 4 & 5)
- Eddy D. Iskandar — lyrics (tracks: 8 & 10)
- Ivan Nestorman — lyrics (tracks: 9 & 12)
- Sumobeat — arrangements (track 6)
- Aria Baron — arrangements (track 7)
- Takaeda — arrangements (track 10)

== Release history ==
Release history for Collaborating Harmony: Dwiki Dharmawan
Region	Date	Format(s)	Label
Various	6 February 2014	Digital download; streaming	Sony
Indonesia	25 February 2014	CD	Sony
