= Soleha =

2007 Indonesian drama television series

- Genre: Drama
- Screenplay by: Serena Luna
- Story by: Serena Luna
- Directed by: Gita Asmara
- Starring: Marshanda; Baim Wong
- Theme music composer: Dwiki Darmawan
- Opening theme: "Dengan Menyebut Nama Allah"
- Ending theme: "Dengan Menyebut Nama Allah"
- Country of origin: Indonesia
- Original language: Indonesian
- No. of seasons: 1
- No. of episodes: 149

Production
- Executive producer: Elly Yanti Noor
- Producer: Leo Sutanto
- Production locations: Persari Studio, South Jakarta
- Camera setup: Multi-camera
- Running time: 60 minutes
- Production company: SinemArt

Original release
- Network: RCTI
- Release: July 23 – December 9, 2007

Soleha is an Indonesian television series that was premiered on July 23, 2007, on RCTI. Produced by SinemArt and directed by Gita Asmara, the series stars Marshanda in her titular lead role.

SinemArt announced the series on July 19, 2007, alongside its cast. It received generally positive reviews, who praised Marshanda's acting.

== Premise ==
Arini Soleha is a strong and tomboyish girl who deepen her religious activities. She lives with her cousin, Mia, and her uncle, Armand. After leaving religious activities, Soleha has been forced to be an assistant, while knowing Rendra, a bus driver.

== Cast ==
- Marshanda as Soleha
- Baim Wong as Ervan
- Amanda as Mia

== Production ==
The series was filmed at Persari Studio, South Jakarta, in early 2007. On July 19, 2007, the cast, Marshanda and Wong, were revealed through a press conference.

== Theme song ==
The theme song for the series, "Dengan Menyebut Nama Allah", written and composed by Dwiki Darmawan and performed by Marshanda as the title character of the series.

== Reception ==
Soleha received positive reviews from Liputan6.com.
