= Harkat Wanita =

- Genre: Mystery drama
- Screenplay by: Eddy D. Iskandar
- Directed by: Christ Helweldery
- Music by: Dwiki Dharmawan
- Country of origin: Indonesia
- Original language: Indonesian
- No. of episodes: 15

Production
- Producers: Ir. Chand Parwez; Shanker R.S., B.Sc.
- Camera setup: Single-camera
- Running time: 30 minutes
- Production company: Starvision

Original release
- Network: RCTI
- Release: November 1, 1996 – February 14, 1997

Harkat Wanita (lit. "Woman's dignity" or "Woman's trait") is an Indonesian mystery drama television series that ran from 1996 to 1997. The series revolves around Asri, a woman who was in a relationship with a businessman named Rudi. Overarching themes include an importance of female empowerment.

Starvision commissioned the series alongside its cast and the composer Dwiki Dharmawan in 1996, after the success of Mutiara Cinta, Nikita and Mentari Di Balik Awan.

== Premise ==
=== Story ===
Asri, a woman who have a relationship with a businessman named Rudi. They broke up when Asri having a crush with another man, while Rudi does the same thing with another woman. When Asri drove away from her house, she has many trials during her angst. When Asri buys a medicine at the drugstore, another woman surprisingly introduces herself as Yanni. Ronnie relies that the woman who looking at him was Yani, marking the first time that she successfully revealed her true identity.

== Cast ==
- Ira Wibowo as Asri, who poses as "Yanni" while setting Ronnie's trap after Baskoro's proposal.
- Adjie Pangestu as Ronnie
- Ully Artha as Risma
- Asrul Zulmi as Baskoro
- Devi Permatasari as Yanni
- Adipura as Edwin
- Robby Sutara
- Jane Catherine as Marina
- Dina Lorenza as Rini
- Paywaz as Bobby
- Adjie Massaid
- Surya C. Saputra

== Music ==
In October 1996, it was confirmed that Dwiki Dharmawan became the series' composer. During the scoring session, Dharmawan captured the theme of "female empowerment" (Note: Original: ...mengangkat tema keagungan wanita...) with an intuitive and majestic music. He recruited twelve string players to record the musical score at his own studio Kita, located at Bintaro with a 32-track recording.

== Reception ==
Harkat Wanita received mixed reviews by critics. Analisa criticized the title as being "absurd". Suara Pembaruan praised Adipura's antagonistic role as Edwin and calling him "a rapist".

== Accolades ==
Year	Award	Category	Nominee	Result	Ref.
1997	Indonesian Soap-Opera Festival	Best Supporting Actor in a Drama	Asrul Zulmi	Nominated	
