= Nafa Urbach =

Indonesian actress and singer

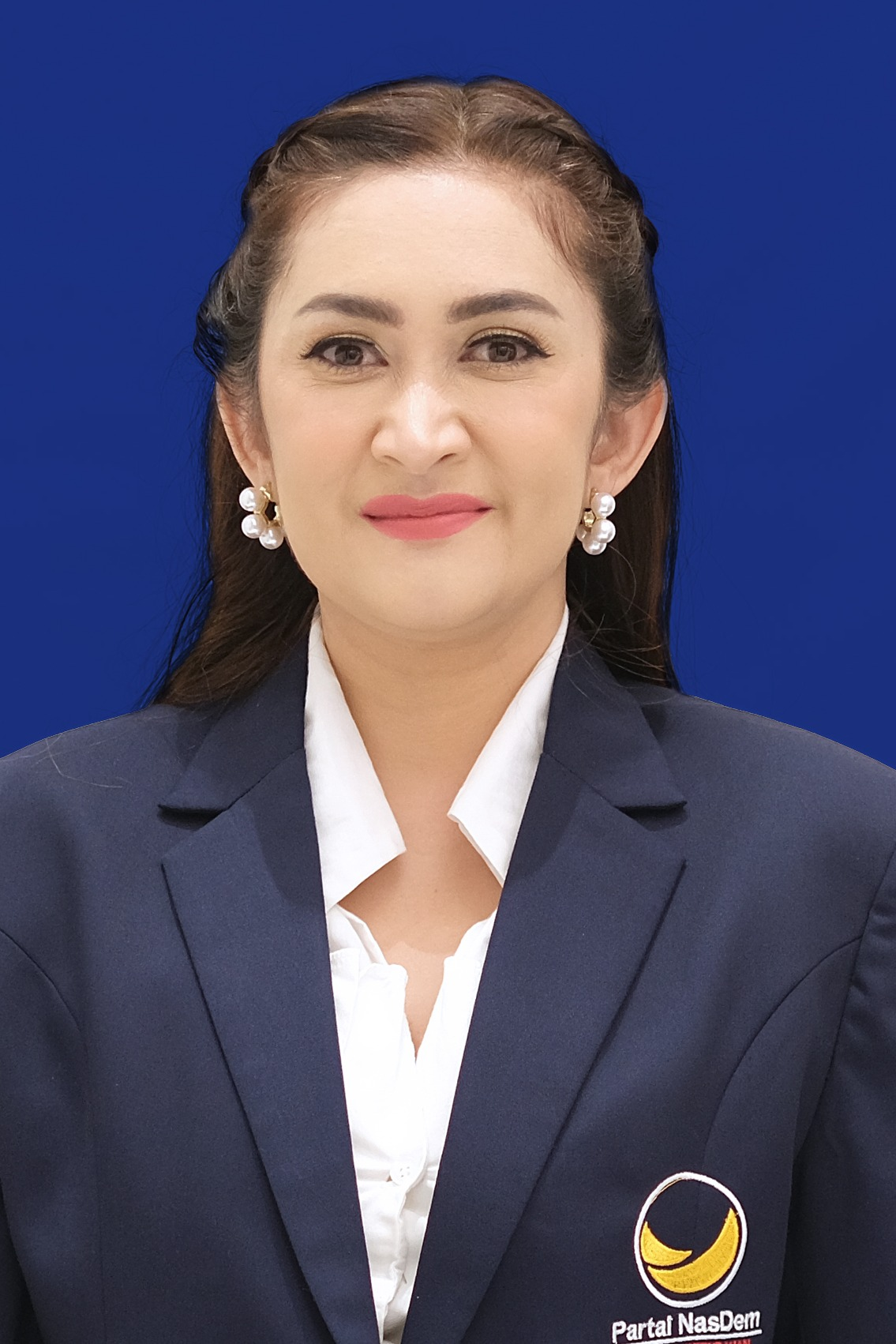
- Electoral portrait, 2023

Member of the House of Representatives
- Incumbent
- Assumed office 1 October 2024
- Preceded by: Multi-members district
- Constituency: Central Java VI

Personal details
- Born: Nafa Indria Urbach; 15 June 1980 (age 46) Magelang, Central Java, Indonesia
- Party: NasDem
- Spouse: Zack Lee (m. 2007; div. 2017)
- Domestic partner: Primus Yustisio (1997–2001)
- Children: Mikhaela Lee Jowono
- Parent(s): Ronald Walter Urbach (father); Neneng Maria Kusuma (mother)
- Relatives: Alam Urbach (brother); Joey Alexander (nephew)
- Occupation: Singer; Dancer; Actress; Businesswoman; Model; Politician
- Musical career
- Genres: Rock; Pop rock; Glam rock; Soft rock; Pop
- Instruments: Vocals, guitar
- Labels: Metrotama Records; Musica Studios

Nafa Indria Urbach (born 15 June 1980) is an Indonesian soap opera actress, singer, and politician. She began her career in the entertainment world with her song "Bagai Lilin Kecil" composed by Deddy Dores. She is often referred to as the successor to the singer Nike Ardilla.

== Biography ==
Nafa Indria Urbach was born on 15 June 1980 in Magelang to Ronald Urbach and Neneng Maria Kusuma. Nafa is the third of the couple's four children; she has two older sisters named Farah and Maya and a younger brother named Alam. She is the aunt of the Indonesian pianist Joey Alexander.

Initially influenced by Elvis Presley, Urbach was in a relationship with Iranian-Indonesian actor Primus Yustisio, who has made appearances in these music videos, starting with "Hatiku Bagai Terpenjara" and ending with "Tiada Dusta Di Hatiku", from 1997 to 2001. Urbach was born a muslim but after hearing Pastor John Hartman's oath following their separation, she decided to convert to Christianity. Urbach married the Chinese Indonesian actor Zack Lee in Jakarta on 16 February 2007. Urbach had met Lee in a nightclub, four years earlier. Though Urbach and Lee had different religious origins, in September 2003, Urbach announced that she had converted from Islam to Christianity before marrying Lee.

After her wedding, Nafa had a miscarriage in September 2007, when she was two months pregnant. She gave birth on 8 February 2011 to a daughter, Mikhaela Lee Jowono. On October 23, 2017 they had officially divorced.

=== Politics ===
Urbach ran as a candidate for the House of Representatives (DPR) for Central Java's 6th electoral district in the 2024 Indonesian legislative election as a NasDem Party member, securing 67 thousand votes and winning a seat. She had also run in 2019, but did not win a seat after securing 21 thousand votes.

In August 2025, responding to public outcry against a proposed DPR allowance hike, Urbach defended the hike, citing commuting difficulties for DPR members living out of Jakarta to Senayan. Her response resulted in more outcries, and she posted an apology shortly afterwards, pledging to donate her allowance payments to her constituents. Urbach's statement, along with others made by some DPR members, triggered public outcry, resulting in protests in late August which escalated into civil unrest and rioting across the country. On 31 August 2025, Nasdem announced her suspension from DPR, along with fellow Nasdem legislator Ahmad Sahroni. A house rented by Zack Lee in Bintaro, mistaken as Urbach's house by rioters, was also looted that day.

== Filmography ==
Year	Title
2018	Kembang Kantil

== Soap operas ==
- Deru Debu (1996–1997) as Nafa
- Kembalinya Si Manis Jembatan Ancol (1996) as Linda
- Bidadari Yang Terluka (1997) as Utari
- Permataku (1999)
- Terpikat (1999–2000)
- Pertalian (2000)
- Dua Kali Aku Mencintamu
- Kehormatan
- Kalau Cinta Sudah Bicara
- Kalau Cinta Sudah Bicara 2
- Mau Nggak Mau Harus Mau
- Pelangi Bidadariku
- Putih Merah
- Permaisari Hatiku
- Langkahku
- Penconpet Cinta 3
- Kurindu Jiwaku
- Pelangi di Wajahku 1
- Pelangi di Wajahku 2
- Aishiteru (2012) as fairy godmother
- Raja Dan Aku
- Segalanya Cinta
- Juna Cinta Juni
- Sepatu Super
- Misteri Toko Antik
- Rahasia Aura
- Malu Malu Kucing

== Discography ==
=== Albums ===
- Bagai Lilin Kecil (1995)
- Hatiku Bagai Terpenjara (1996)
- Hati Tergores Cinta (1996)
- Hati Yang Kecewa (1997)
- Hatiku Bagai Di Sangkar Emas (1998)
- Tiada Dusta Di Hatiku (1999)
- Bilakah (2000)
- Gita Cinta (2000)
- Jujur Saja (2001)
- Berlari (2004)
- Ku Tak Sempurna (2010)

=== Singles ===
- Deru Debu (1997)
- Bandung Menangis Lagi (1995)
- Hati Yang Rindu (1998)
- Wanita Super (2009)
- Cinta Abadi (2009)
- Belahan Jiwa (2014)
- Melepasmu Kelemahanku (2017)

=== Unreleased Song ===
- Ost Ku rindu Jiwaku (2004)
- Pertamaku Jatuh Cinta (2014/2017)
- Cintaku Bukan Hiasan (2014/2017)
- Selamatkan Cinta (2014/2021)
