= Shena Malsiana =

Indonesian singer (1991–2023)

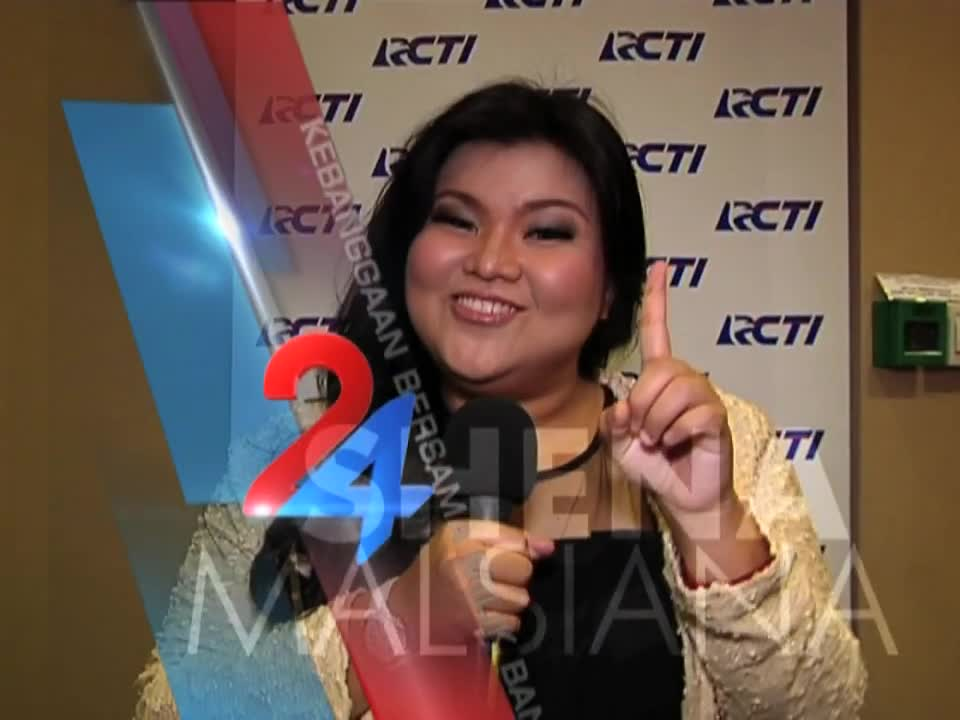
- Shena in 2013

Background information
- Born: 14 October 1991; Jakarta, Indonesia
- Died: 25 October 2023 (aged 32)
- Genres: Pop; Jazz
- Occupation: Singer
- Years active: 2013–2023

Shena Malsiana (14 October 1991 – 25 October 2023) was an Indonesian singer. She was a contestant in the first season of X Factor Indonesia, where she finished in fifth place.

== Career ==
Shena Malsiana was born on October 14, 1991 in Jakarta, Indonesia. She is of Japanese and Bengkulu descent.

Although her audition song had a jazz arrangement, she also liked listening to Dream Theater. Prior to entering X Factor, she had auditioned four times for Indonesian Idol.

She was the singer for the track "Imaji" [Image] on the 2014 Dwiki Dharmawan tribute album Collaborating Harmony: Dwiki Dharmawan. This song was first released in 1987 by Dwiki's band Krakatau, with Trie Utami as the lead singer. Malsiana had not listened to the original version, and reviewers praised her performance compared to the original.

In 2012, Shena was a volunteer for the Ramadhan Jazz Festival in Jakarta. After appearing on the X Factor, she performed at the 2013, 2014, and 2016 editions of the festival.

Although Shena was signed to a major label from 2013 to 2016, she returned to being an independent artist in 2017. Her subsequent single "What Do You Need" was self-written. Due to the expenses involved, she waited two years to release her next single "Melawan Awan" (2019); this song was co-written by Shena and the song's producer Sukma Raya. This single was more successful, which led her to release a follow-up three months later, "Nelangsa" [Sad]. "Nelangsa" was produced by Anugrah Swastadi.

In June 2020, Shena released the single "Lagu Marah" [Angry Song], produced by Anugrah Swastadi, to eventually lead to a full-length album. She made one further release in that year, "Yang Berlalu" [The Past] (2020).

After some delay, the album Fragmen [Fragments] would eventually release in December 2022. She preceded its release with the single "Terlalu Ikhlas Untuk Kau Sakiti" [Too Sincere For You to Hurt] (2022). She intended this album as revealing her "dark side", although tempered with optimism. Reviewers noted its somber tone.

== Death ==
Shena died from complications of lupus on 25 October 2023, at the age of 32. Her sister revealed that Malsiana was diagnosed with lupus nephritis in 2021, and had been receiving dialysis treatment for a year.
