= Krakatau (band) =

Indonesian jazz pop band

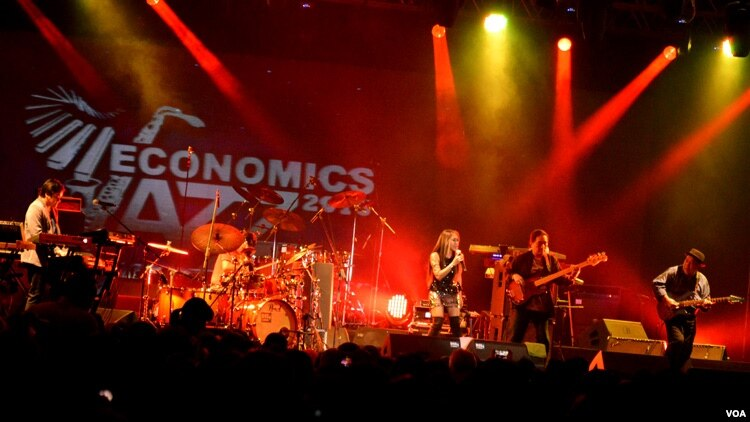
- Krakatau (as Krakatau Reunion) performing at the 21st Economics Jazz in Indonesia, 2015

Background information
- Origin: Bandung, West Java, Indonesia
- Genres: Jazz fusion
- Years active: 1984–present
- Label: Independent
- Spinoffs: Krakatau Ethno
- Members: See members below
- Past members: Hari Moekti; Donny Suhendra; Budhy Haryono; Ruth Sahanaya

Krakatau are an Indonesian band founded by Pra Budi Dharma and Dwiki Dharmawan in 1984. The band currently consists of twelve members divided into two sub-units: Krakatau and Krakatau Ethno. The band debuted as a six-piece ensemble in January 1987, with the single "Gemilang".

== History ==
=== 1984-1985: Formation ===
Dwiki Dharmawan founded Krakatau in 1984, with his bandmates Pra Budi Dharma and Donny Suhendra. The band participated at the 1985 Light Music Contest in Tokyo, Japan.

=== 1987: Debut with "Gemilang" ===
In 1986, the band has changed its formation in addition of Trie Utami, Indra Lesmana and Gilang Ramadhan. The band released their breakout eponymous album, Krakatau, in 1987. The title track "Gemilang" ("Dazzling") composed by Dharmawan and written by filmmaker Mira Lesmana, became a critical and commercial success, selling over 800.000 copies.

== Members ==
Current

- Pra Budi Dharma (1984-present)
- Gilang Ramadhan (1986-1992; 2013-present)
- Indra Lesmana (1986-1992; 2013-present)
- Dwiki Dharmawan (1984-present; inactive due to solo activities)
- Trie Utami (1986-2000; 2013-present)
- Ade Rudiana (1994-2006; 2023-present)
- Nya Ina Raseuki (2000-2006; 2023-present)
- Zainal Arifin (2000-2006; 2023-present)
- Yoyon Dharsono (2000-2006; 2023-present)
- Gerry Herb (2000-2006; 2023-present)
- Andre Dinuth (2023-present)
- Barry Likumahuwa (2023-present)

Former

- Hari Moekti (1985)
- Donny Suhendra (1984-1992; 2013-2022)
- Budhy Haryono (1984-1985; 1992-2006)
- Ruth Sahanaya (1985)

== Discography ==
- Krakatau (1987)
- Krakatau (1988)
- Kembali Satu (1990)
- Let There be Life (1992)
- Reunion: Chapter One (2016)
- Reunion: Chapter Two (2018)
