= A Note to God =

2017 Indonesian film

Surat Kecil untuk Tuhan
- Indonesian theatrical release poster
- Directed by: Fajar Bustomi
- Screenplay by: Upi Avianto
- Story by: Fajar Bustomi
- Based on: Surat Kecil untuk Tuhan by Agnes Davonar
- Produced by: Frederica
- Starring: Bunga Citra Lestari; Joe Taslim; Lukman Sardi; Aura Kasih; Bima Azriel; Izzati Khansa; Ben Joshua; Rifnu Wikana; Maudy Koesnaedi; Jeroen Lezer; Susan Bachtiar; Chew Kin Wah
- Cinematography: Yudi Datau
- Edited by: Ryan Purwoko
- Music by: Andhika Triyadi
- Production company: Falcon Pictures
- Release dates: 20 June 2017 (CGV Grand Indonesia); 25 June 2017 (Indonesia)
- Country: Indonesia
- Language: Indonesian
- Budget: Rp10 billion
- Box office: Rp26,4 billion

A Note to God (Indonesian: Surat Kecil untuk Tuhan) is a 2017 Indonesian adventure film produced by Falcon Pictures. Based on the novel by Agnes Davonar, it is the second installment of the Surat Kecil untuk Tuhan film series and was directed by Fajar Bustomi. The film stars the ensemble cast led by Bunga Citra Lestari, Joe Taslim, and Lukman Sardi. Set in the early 2000s, the story follows Anton (Azriel) and Angel (Khansa), the orphan siblings who were stuck in a syndication in which uses homeless children.

Following the release of My Stupid Boss, Upi began working on the project when the idea first started. She pitched the concept to Falcon to develop A Note to God, while the story is inspired by various family films, including Lion and Frozen. Development for A Note to God lasted for six months, on an approximate 10 billion Rupiah budget, and the film faced production difficulties, including story changes.

A Note to God was premiered at CGV Grand Indonesia in Jakarta on 20 June 2017, and was released in Indonesia five days after. The film received generally positive reviews, grossing 26,4 billion rupiah, making it the fifteenth highest-grossing Indonesian film of 2017. The film won Bandung Film Festival for Best Cinematography and AMI Award for Best Children's Album, respectively. It was also nominated for Citra Award for Best Child Performance and Indonesian Choice Award for Movie of the Year, in 2017 and 2018, respectively.

== Plot ==
In 2002, orphaned siblings Anton and Angel are trapped in a criminal syndicate, robbed of a normal childhood. Their uncle, Rudi, harshly scolds them for their poverty. One day, Angel reconnects with her childhood friend Mirna and plays in a nearby playground. Their brief moment of freedom is shattered when Asep and Rudi arrive and punish them violently, leaving Angel injured while Anton sings on the street. Later, Angel meets Martin, a young man in a wheelchair, as Martin’s mother photographs the three together. A tragic roadway accident soon separates Angel from Anton, leaving her unaware of her brother’s whereabouts.

Fifteen years later in Sydney, Australia, Angel has grown into a successful lawyer. She reunites with Martin, now a compassionate doctor, and their connection blossoms into love. Martin shares the story of a pilot with Ricky, an aviation-enthusiast child, who later succumbs to heart cancer. Angel returns to Indonesia, meeting Maria, an orphaned young girl, and eventually locating Anton, who has endured surgery under Rudi’s control, forcing Angel to keep her distance for years.

Angel announces her marriage to Martin but returns to Jakarta to search for Anton. In court, Rudi recounts the plight of homeless children, and Angel continues the narrative, revealing the syndicate’s crimes. Television coverage exposes human trafficking operations, prompting Angel to emotionally reach out to Martin in Sydney. After engaging in community activities with Martin, Angel visits Anton’s grave following his death from a heart attack, closing a chapter marked by loss, resilience, and reunion.

== Cast ==
- Bunga Citra Lestari as Angel, a lawyer who forget her beautiful childhood
  - Izzati Khansa as young Angel
- Joe Taslim as Martin, a young doctor who took the heart specialist
  - Yuvens as young Martin
- Bima Azriel as Anton, Angel's elder brother
- Lukman Sardi as Rudi
- Aura Kasih as Ningsih
  - Avril Sigarlaki as young Ningsih
- Rifnu Wikana as Asep
- Ben Joshua as Joko
- Maudy Koesnaedi as Soraya
- Jeroen Lezer as Edward
- Chew Kin Wah as Martin's father
- Susan Bachtiar as Martin's mother
- Dorman Borisman as Mr. Wiryawan
- Kevin Bzezovski Taroreh as Ricky, a 10-year-old boy
- Nadia Bulan Sofya as Mirna, Angel's childhood friend
- Aqeela Calista as Maria, Angel's friend

== Production ==
=== Development ===
The film's origins trace back to June 2016, when Falcon approached Upi about the pitch of the film adaptation following the success of her film My Stupid Boss. Falcon has planned 2 out of 6 films based on Surat Kecil untuk Tuhan series of novels. Development for A Note to God lasted for six months, on an approximate 10 billion Rupiah budget, and the film faced production difficulties, including story changes. On 28 April 2017, the official poster for the film was released, followed by the official trailer in May.

=== Writing ===
My Stupid Boss director Upi Avianto was hired to write the screenplay. Ultimately, Upi received "screenplay by" credit, while Bustomi received "story by" credit.

Lestari cited family films including Lion (2016) and Frozen (2013) as particular influences when she enjoyed leaning into the drama as a storytelling genre.

=== Music ===
A full soundtrack album was released by Falcon Music on 19 May, a month before the film's release, and curated to represent Anton and Angel's childhood. Thirteen singers of the Purwa Caraka Music Studio Choir served as the soundtrack singers for the film, marking their first collaboration with Falcon Pictures. In the soundtrack session, Bustomi felt its songs "heartwarming" and "nostalgic"; when these songs are inserted into the film, it brings the majestic ambience. A cover of "Dengan Menyebut Nama Allah", written by Dwiki Dharmawan and Ags Arya Dipayana and performed by the PCMS Choir, was also used in the film, although it did not appear on the soundtrack album.

== Release ==
=== Marketing ===
The official trailer for the film was released on 31 May 2017. Marketing A Note was considered difficult despite the enthusiasm of executives at Falcon for the film. Writing for Liputan 6, Aditia Saputra described this as "most expensive", spending over 10 billion rupiahs.

=== Theatrical ===
A Note received its gala premiere on 20 June 2017 at CGV Grand Indonesia in Jakarta, five days before the official theatrical release. In Indonesia, it was released with Sweet 20, Jailangkung and Insya Allah Sah. GSC Movies acquired the film's Malaysian distribution rights, releasing it theatrically on 3 August.

=== Streaming ===
A Note to God was made available to stream worldwide on Netflix on 6 July 2023, followed by its domestic digital release on Vidio on 30 August.

=== Leak onto Instagram ===
On 2 July 2017, clips of the film were illegally posted onto Syahrini's Instagram story until it was removed by moderators. The incident has raised concerns about Indonesian anti-piracy law of films.

== Reception ==
=== Box office ===
In Indonesia, A Note to God grossed over 26 billion rupiah. The film left theaters by August 2017, making it the year's fifteenth highest-grossing film.

=== Critical response ===
A Note to God received generally positive reviews. However, in a review by Republika, A Note to God is not appropriate for children watching it.

=== Accolades ===
At the 30th Bandung Film Festival, A Note won Best Cinematography. The film's other nominations include Citra Award for Best Child Performance, Indonesian Choice Award for Movie of the Year, and an AMI Award (which it won Best Children's Album).
