= Adjie Massaid =

Indonesian actor (1967–2011)

- Born: Raden Pandji Chandra Pratomo Samiadji Massaid; August 7, 1967; Jakarta, Indonesia
- Died: February 5, 2011 (aged 43); Jakarta, Indonesia
- Occupations: Actor, model, politician
- Spouses: Reza Artamevia (1999–2005); Angelina Sondakh (2009–2011)
- Children: Zahwa Rezi Massaid; Aaliyah Massaid; Keanu Jabaar Massaid

Raden Pandji Chandra Pratomo Samiadji "Adjie" Massaid (August 7, 1967 – February 5, 2011) was an Indonesian actor, model, and politician. He was a member of the House of Representatives (Dewan Perwakilan Rakyat) in 2004–2009 and 2009–2014 from the Democratic Party.

== Early life and career ==
Adjie Massaid was born in Jakarta, the second of the four children of Raden Pandji Sujono Tjondro Adiningrat, who was born in 1932, and Joyce Broers. He was of Javanese-Madurese-Dutch descent. Adjie spent his childhood in Rawamangun, East Jakarta. In 1975, when he was in the 4th grade of elementary school, he and his family moved to the Netherlands. During his adolescence, he joined Ajax Amsterdam Juniors.

Adjie started his career as a catwalk model. His first screen appearance was in Garin Nugroho's 1991 film Cinta Dalam Sepotong Roti (Love In a Piece of Bread).

== Political career ==
Adjie began his career in politics by joining the Democratic Party, led by Susilo Bambang Yudhoyono, in 2004. With the Democrat Party victory in 2004 election, Adjie was chosen to be the member of the House of Representatives (DPR) for the Democratic Party. In the second period of Yudhoyono's government, he was chosen for the second time as a member of Komisi V DPR 2009–2014. Besides being active as a politician, Adjie was also the U–23 national pre-Olympics soccer team manager.

== Personal life ==
Adjie had a younger brother, Mudji Massaid, an actor and singer who was born in 1976 and married to Lucyana, a disjockey who was 10 years his junior, in 2022. He had an older sister, Cherie Massaid, and a half-sister, Linda Djalil, a journalist.

Adjie married the singer Reza Artamevia on 9 February 1999. From this marriage, they had 2 children, named Zahwa and Aaliyah. They divorced on 17 January 2005, Adjie regained custody of his two children. Adjie built a relationship with Angelina Sondakh and they got married on 29 April 2009. They had one child named Keanu Dluha Jabaar Massaid, born on 9 September 2009.

His father, Raden Pandji Sujono Tjondro, died at Pusat Jantung Nasional Harapan Kita in Kota Bambu Utara, Palmerah, in 2010, due to heart failure and complications at the age of 77. Adjie Massaid died in Jakarta on Friday, 5 February 2011, at around 12 am, eleven months after the death of his father. He is buried at Jeruk Purut Cemetery in South Jakarta.

== Filmography ==
- "Cinta Dalam Sepotong Roti" (1990)
- "Rini Tomboy" (1991)
- "Asmara" (1992)
- "Pengantin Cinta" (2010)

== Television ==
- Buku Harian I
- Buku Harian II
- Buku Harian III
- Janji Hati
- Mutiara Cinta
- Bidadari Yang Terluka
- Melangkah Di Atas Awan
- Merah Hitam Cinta
- Kabulkan Doaku
- Mahligai Di Atas Pasir
