= Ags. Arya Dipayana =

Indonesian writer (1961–2011)

- Born: Agung Setiadji; 29 April 1961; Tulungagung, East Java, Indonesia
- Died: 1 March 2011 (aged 49); Jakarta, Indonesia
- Occupations: poet, dramatist, writer
- Years active: 1977–2011
- Notable work: "Dengan Menyebut Nama Allah"

Agung Setiadji, better known by his stage name Ags. Arya Dipayana (29 April 1961 – 1 March 2011), was an Indonesian poet, dramatist and writer. He was best known for writing "Dengan Menyebut Nama Allah" with Dwiki Dharmawan.

== Career ==
In 1987, he composed the sound poetry, set to the text of "Aku Ingin" by Sapardi Djoko Damono, performed by Ari Malibu and Reda Gaudiamo. Four years later, it was rearranged and repurposed for Garin Nugroho film Cinta dalam Sepotong Roti, performed by Katara member Ratna Octaviani. Later in 1992, in collaboration with Dwiki Dharmawan, he wrote "Dengan Menyebut Nama Allah", sung by Novia Kolopaking.

== Death ==
Arya Dipayana died on 1 March 2011, while submitting theatrical works in Purwakarta, West Java. He was buried a day later in Jakarta.

== Filmography ==
=== Films ===
| Year | Title | Director | Notes | Ref. |
|---|---|---|---|---|
| 1990 | Cinta dalam Sepotong Roti | Garin Nugroho | "Aku Ingin" only | |
| 1995 | Regret | Sophan Sophiaan | "Dengan Menyebut Nama Allah" only | |
| 2017 | A Note to God | Fajar Bustomi | "Dengan Menyebut Nama Allah" only; posthumous release | |

=== Television ===
| Year | Title | Director(s) | Notes | Ref. |
|---|---|---|---|---|
| 1998 | Kau Tak Sendiri | Alex Komang | Screenplay | |
| 2000 | Kabulkan Doaku | Maman Firmansyah | "Dengan Menyebut Nama Allah" only | |
| 2017 | Kisah Nyata | Various | "Dengan Menyebut Nama Allah" only; posthumous release | |

== Songwriting credits ==
| Year | Artist | Album | Song | Other writer(s) |
|---|---|---|---|---|
| 1992 | Novia Kolopaking | Dengan Menyebut Nama Allah | "Dengan Menyebut Nama Allah" | —N/a |
| 1992 | Trie Utami | Dengan Menyebut Nama Allah | "Jangan Kau Kira" | —N/a |
| 1992 | Dian A.G.P. | Dengan Menyebut Nama Allah | "Doa Di Tengah Dosa" | —N/a |
| 1992 | Inka Christie | Dengan Menyebut Nama Allah | "Gelar Kehidupan" | —N/a |
| 1992 | Puput Novel | Dengan Menyebut Nama Allah | "Selagi Belum Lupa" | —N/a |
| 1992 | Neno Warisman | Dengan Menyebut Nama Allah | "Hai Kembara" | —N/a |
| 1992 | Male Voice | Dengan Menyebut Nama Allah | "Kepada Kesangsian" | —N/a |
| 1994 | Uchy Amyrtha | The Soundtrack Collection | "Hati Seluas Samudra" | —N/a |
| 1994 | Asti Asmodiwati | The Soundtrack Collection | "Kisah Kehidupan" | —N/a |
| 1994 | Chandra | The Soundtrack Collection | "Liku Kehidupan" | —N/a |
| 1996 | Ita Purnamasari | KepadaMu Ya Allah/Dalam Sujudku | "Dalam Sujudku" | —N/a |
| 1996 | Ita Purnamasari | KepadaMu Ya Allah/Dalam Sujudku | "Bagimu Ibu" | Ita Purnamasari |
| 1997 | Agus Wisman | Ingin Aku | "Ingin Aku" | —N/a |
| 2002 | Ita Purnamasari | Cintamu | "Tiada Yang Melebihi" | —N/a |
