= Kabulkan Doaku =

Indonesian family television series

- Genre: Drama; Family
- Screenplay by: Bung SMAS
- Story by: Iman Hermawan YB
- Directed by: H. Maman Firmansyah
- Starring: Adjie Massaid; Dian Nitami; Devi Permatasari
- Theme music composer: Dwiki Dharmawan
- Opening theme: "Dengan Menyebut Nama Allah" performed by Novia Kolopaking
- Ending theme: "Dengan Menyebut Nama Allah" performed by Novia Kolopaking
- Composer: Dian HP
- Country of origin: Indonesia
- Original language: Indonesian

Production
- Producer: Gope T. Samtani
- Camera setup: Single-camera
- Production company: Rapi Films

Original release
- Network: RCTI
- Release: November 20, 2000

Kabulkan Doaku is an Indonesian television series that was first aired on RCTI in November 2000. Directed by Maman Firmansyah from a screenplay written by Bung SMAS, the series stars Adjie Massaid, Dian Nitami and Devi Permatasari.

== Premise ==
Principal brothers Lesmana and Darma took over a business previously run by their father. When Ratna gained control of Lesmana's wealth, their partnership fell apart. Ratna then reassured her husband by stating that Darma's legacy was not equivalent to Lesmana's. However, Lesmana's family vacation plans were jeopardized when Ratna contacted a man who caused the car's handbrake to fail, resulting in a car accident that left Lesmana's family blindfolded.

== Cast ==
- Adjie Massaid
- Dian Nitami as Ratna
- Devi Permatasari as:
  - Sofia, Lesmana's wife.
  - Farida, a girl who felt anxious after being struggled with stroke.

== Production ==
Principal casting of Kabulkan Doaku began in 2000. Devi Permatasari, who portrayed the protagonist Farida, states that the character "anxious after struggled with stroke".

=== Music ===
The song "Dengan Menyebut Nama Allah" performed by the Indonesian singer and actress Novia Kolopaking, and written by Ags. Arya Dipayana and Dwiki Dharmawan, used as the theme song of the series and was included in the soundtrack album.
