= Bella Vista (1994 TV series) =

1994 Indonesian television series

- Title card for the first season
- Genre: Romantic comedy
- Screenplay by: Nasri Cheppy; Satmowi Atmowiloto
- Story by: Nasri Cheppy; Satmowi Atmowiloto
- Directed by: Nasri Cheppy; Christi Maharsi
- Creative director: Raakhee Punjabi
- Starring: Roy Marten
- Theme music composer: Dwiki Dharmawan
- Country of origin: Indonesia
- Original language: Indonesian
- No. of seasons: 3
- No. of episodes: 37

Production
- Executive producers: Gobind Punjabi; Dhamoo Punjabi
- Producer: Raam Punjabi
- Editors: Moru-Shri; Ess Jay
- Camera setup: Multi-camera
- Running time: ±45 minutes
- Production company: Multivision Plus

Original release
- Network: RCTI
- Release: December 4, 1994 – July 23, 1995
- Release: January 19 – May 11, 1997

Bella Vista (Italian for "Beautiful View") is an Indonesian romantic comedy television series written and directed by Nasri Cheppy and produced by Multivision Plus. First aired on RCTI in December 1994, the series stars Roy Marten in his lead role. With a production budget of Rp 60-75 million per episode, Bella Vista was recognized as MVP's main feature on that time.

== Premise ==
Benny Latin is a rich businessman who expanded locations of his store chain. He solved the issues by defeating his unhelpful enemies in response to the expansion of his fashion-focused company Bella Vista.

== Cast ==
- Roy Marten as Benny Latin
- Angel Ibrahim as Lydia
- August Melasz as Johan
- Ryan Hidayat and Teuku Ryan as Andre
- Venna Melinda and Anna Valiana as Bella Tamiya, the only daughter of Benny Latin and Vivi Suryani Tamiya.
  - Nadira portrayed Bella Tamiya as a child.
- Fransisca as Vera
- Jeremy Thomas as Indra Laksana
- Deddy Rizaldy as Dicky Alamsyah
- Sellen Fernandez as Martin Ankara
- Dwi Yan as Dedi
- Gitty Srinita as Siska
- Roy Karyadi as Rudy
- Piet Pagau as Darsa
- Fuad Baradja as Slamet
- Roy Lino as Hermawan
- Dwinta Stania as Leny
- Titi Suwarno as a mistress
- Milla Rose as Ratna
- Intan Savilla as Suzy
- Tompoh Salvatore as Frans
- Cut Sarra as Anita

Special appearance

- Ira Wibowo as Vivi Suryani Tamiya

== Episodes ==
Season	Episodes	Originally released	
Season	Episodes	First released	Last released
1	10	December 4, 1994	February 7, 1995
2	11	May 14, 1995	July 23, 1995
3	16	January 19, 1997	May 11, 1997

== Soundtrack ==
No.	Title	Lyrics	Music	Arrangement	Length
1.	"Impian Cinta" ("Dream of Love"; performed by Uchi Amyrtha and Iwan Zein)	Dwiki Dharmawan	Dwiki Dharmawan	Dwiki Dharmawan
2.	"Impian Cinta" (instrumental)		Dwiki Dharmawan	Dwiki Dharmawan
3.	"Sia-Sia Ku Menunggu" ("I Am So Futile to Wait for You")		Dwiki Dharmawan	Dwiki Dharmawan
4.	"Salah Sangka" ("Unexpected"; performed by Eka Deli and Johnson Hutagalung)	Oddie Agam; Ussy Pieters	Oddie Agam	Oddie Agam
5.	"Just You and Me" (instrumental)			Addie MS
6.	"Hidup Tanpa Cinta" ("Living without Love"; performed by Eka Deli)			Addie MS

== Reception ==
Bella Vista was initially met with negative reviews during its airing. Mien Sugandhi, then-Minister of Feminist Roles, criticized the series containing cohabitation scenes that were not fit in with Indonesia, and ruining female empowerment themes. In a 1997 review by Berita Yudha, Soesilo Soedarman declared that Bella Vista also contained violent scenes.

=== Later reception ===
Writing for Brilio, the series marked Venna Melinda's television acting debut.

== Cultural impact ==
The 2024 book by Gunawan Tri Atmodjo, Sarekat Bajing Kelon, directly referenced Bella Vista.

== See also ==
- List of television shows notable for negative reception
