= Novia Kolopaking =

Indonesian singer (born 1972)

- Born: Novia Sanganingrum Saptarea Kolopaking; 9 November 1972 (age 53); Bandung, West Java, Indonesia
- Occupations: Singer; actress
- Years active: 1983—present
- Spouse: Emha Ainun Nadjib (m. 1997)
- Children: 4
- Musical career
- Genres: Pop; Rock; Slow rock; Soul; Pop kreatif; Pop melankolis
- Instrument: Vocals
- Labels: Musica; Independent
- Member of: Kiai Kanjeng

Novia Sanganingrum Saptarea Kolopaking (born 9 November 1972) is an Indonesian singer and actress. She is known for singing "Dengan Menyebut Nama Allah" co-composed by Dwiki Dharmawan, released in 1992.

== Career ==
Kolopaking began her career through vocal lessons at Pranadjaya's Bina Vokalia School in 1983. She made her breakout role as Sitti Nurbaya, on the television series of the same name in 1992. In the same year, she released her signature song "Dengan Menyebut Nama Allah", written by Dwiki Dharmawan. She also known for her role as Ema in Keluarga Cemara family television drama in 1996.

In November 2000, her song "Dengan Menyebut Nama Allah" resurged in popularity after it was featured in the Rapi Films Ramadan drama television series Kabulkan Doaku.

== Discography ==
- Kembali (1992)
- Biar Kusimpan Rinduku (1994)
- Untukmu Segalanya (1995)
- Asmara (1997)
- Cinta (1998)

== Singles ==
Title	Peak chart positions
Title	IDN Ank.
"Dengan Menyebut Nama Allah"	7

== Filmography ==
Year	Titles	Role	Notes	Ref.
1996	Keluarga Cemara	Ema		
2000	Kabulkan Doaku		Original songs and themes	
