= Cinta dalam Sepotong Roti =

- Directed by: Garin Nugroho
- Starring: Adjie Massaid; Rizky Erzet Teo; Tio Pakusadewo; Monica Oemardi
- Music by: Dwiki Dharmawan
- Release date: 1991
- Running time: 100 minutes
- Country: Indonesia
- Language: Indonesian

Cinta dalam Sepotong Roti (English: Love in a Slice of Bread) is a 1991 Indonesian road film directed by Garin Nugroho. The film was later adapted into a novel of the same name by novelist Fira Basuki and stars Adjie Massaid, Monica Oemardi, Tio Pakusadewo and Rizky Erzet Teo. Subsequently, the film won a Citra Award for Best Film at the 1991 Indonesian Film Festival.

== Plot ==
Mayang, Harris and Topan are good friends since childhood. Mayang, a columnist in a female magazine, has been married to Harris, a professional, while Topan is still single and a photographer. When Mayang and Harris go on a vacation to solve their sexual problem in their marriage. Topan is invited to join them. On the trip, the problems of the three friends unravel. Harris has sexual difficulties because of his past trauma and though Mayang tries to understand and is sympathetic, it doesn't help. Then Topan still harbours his childhood love for Mayang. Finally, Harris is suspicious towards Mayang and Topan.

== Cast ==
- Adjie Massaid as Harris
- Monica Oemardi as Lala
- Tio Pakusadewo as Topan
- Rizky Erzet Teo as Mayang

== Soundtrack ==
No.	Title	Writer(s)	Performer	Length
1.	"Aku Ingin" ("I Want")	Ags. Arya Dipayana	Ratna Octaviani
2.	"Masa Kecil" ("Childhood")	Dwiki Dharmawan; Andre Hehanussa; Ancha Haiz	Katara Singers

== Accolades ==
Award	Date	Category	Nominee	Result	Ref.
Indonesian Film Festival	16 November 1991	Best Picture	Budiati Abiyoga, Adi Tahir and Robert S. Sumendap	Won	
Indonesian Film Festival	16 November 1991	Best Original Score	Dwiki Dharmawan	Won	
Indonesian Film Festival	16 November 1991	Best Sound	Sapto Busono	Won	
Indonesian Film Festival	16 November 1991	Best Photography	Saleh Ruslani	Won	
Indonesian Film Festival	16 November 1991	Best Editing	AG Pradjawinata	Won	
