= Bidadari Yang Terluka =

1997 Indonesian romantic fantasy television series

- Promotional poster
- Genre: Romantic fantasy; Supernatural; Teen drama
- Screenplay by: Eddy D. Iskandar; Doddy Soeryaputra
- Directed by: Christ Helweldery
- Starring: Ria Irawan; Donny Damara; Bella Saphira; Dian Nitami; Nafa Urbach
- Theme music composer: Dwiki Dharmawan
- Opening theme: "Bidadari Yang Terluka" performed by Ita Purnamasari
- Composer: Dwiki Dharmawan
- Country of origin: Indonesia
- Original language: Indonesian
- No. of seasons: 1
- No. of episodes: 26

Production
- Producers: Chand Parwez Servia; Shankar RS
- Camera setup: Single camera
- Running time: 45 minutes
- Production company: Starvision

Original release
- Network: RCTI
- Release: June 6, 1997 – January 2, 1998

Bidadari Yang Terluka (English: "Rage of Angel") is a 1997 Indonesian romantic fantasy television series directed by Christ Helweldery from a screenplay by Eddy D. Iskandar. The series stars Ria Irawan, Donny Damara, Bella Saphira, Dian Nitami and Nafa Urbach in their respective lead roles.

Starvision officially announced in early 1997, that Ria Irawan was preparing to shoot the then-upcoming series in Jakarta, Batam and Singapore for release in June. In April 1997, the company revealed the official title for the series, Bidadari Yang Terluka. Two months later, a release date was officially announced.

== Synopsis ==
Novia is a motherish, patient girl who did wrong with her mother, Laksmini, and her father, Koswara. Her mother-in-law, Herawati, hated her when Erdin planned to marry with Miranda. Hariman later decided to marry Erdin with Novia in a family relationship with Laksmini. Later, Hariman reported that Herawati murdered Novia, then he abruptly drove his car at high speed until it collided and died. Novia was later hospitalized with her new face and identity, Mayang, following Ricky's proposal.

== Cast and characters ==
- Ria Irawan as Novia, a young woman who reemerges as "Mayang" after her recovery.
- Donny Damara as Ricky
- Bella Saphira and Dominique as Rosita
- Dian Nitami as Karina
- Nafa Urbach as Utari
- Drg. Fadly as Hariman and Himawan
- Nenny Triana as Laksmini
- Adjie Massaid and Dicky Chandra as Erdin
- Henidar Amroe as Herawati and Halimah
- Cindy C. Harahap as Miranda
- Donny Kesuma as Anton
- Jane Catherine as Nita
- Jihan Fahira as Sofia
- Ponco Buwono as Helmi
- Cindy Fatikasari as Santi
- Jamil Reza as Yoga

== Production ==
In 1997, after the success of Harkat Wanita, Starvision announced that Ria Irawan was preparing to shoot the then-upcoming series in Jakarta, Batam and Singapore for release in June. On June 2, 1997, Starvision officially revealed the series' airdate, which was premiered four days later. During the promotion, producer Chand Parwez said Bidadari Yang Terluka shared similarities with Return to Eden starring Rebecca Gilling.

== Music ==
Indonesian musician Dwiki Dharmawan composed the orchestral score. The title theme "Bidadari Yang Terluka" written by Eddy D. Iskandar, with Dharmawan participating in production and composition, and performed by the latter's wife, Ita Purnamasari.

== Reception ==
=== Later reception ===
Writing for Brilio, Chandra's role as Erdin is memorable to the audience of the 1990s.
