= Trie Utami =

Indonesian singer and pianist

- Born: Trie Utami Sari; 8 January 1968 (age 58); Bandung, Indonesia
- Other name: Iie
- Occupations: Singer-songwriter, pianist
- Years active: 1986–present

Trie Utami Sari (born 8 January 1968) is an Indonesian singer-songwriter and pianist. Prior to debuting with Krakatau, she is the former vocalist of Kahitna.

== Discography ==
- 1991 – Untuk Ayah dan Ibu Tercinta
- 1992 – Kau yang Kutunggu
- 1995 – Cemburu
- 1996 – Mungkinkah Terjadi
- 2007 – Kekasih Bayangan

== Singles ==
Title	Peak chart positions
Title	IDN Bali
"Tiada Lagi Keraguan"	7
