= Dengan Menyebut Nama Allah =

1993 song by Novia Kolopaking

Single by Novia Kolopaking

from the album Dengan Menyebut Nama Allah
- Language: Indonesian
- Written: 1989—1990
- Released: 1993
- Studio: Mixmasters, Jakarta; Musica, Jakarta
- Genre: Islamic
- Length: 5:01
- Songwriters: Ags. Arya Dipayana; Dwiki Dharmawan
- Producers: Ags. Arya Dipayana; Dwiki Dharmawan

Novia Kolopaking singles chronology
| "Kembali" (1992) | "Dengan Menyebut Nama Allah" (1993) | "Biar Ku Simpan Rinduku" (1994) |

Music video
- "Dengan Menyebut Nama Allah" by Novia Kolopaking on YouTube

"Dengan Menyebut Nama Allah" (English: "In the Name of Allah" or "Saying the Name of Allah") is a song recorded by singer and actress Novia Kolopaking. It was released in March 1993, as the lead single of the special album, through Musica Studios as its distributor. Written and produced by Ags. Arya Dipayana and Dwiki Dharmawan, it is primarily an Islamic song with keyboards and choir-like vocals, while the lyrics hint towards themselves do many ways to feel good.

Considered as Kolopaking's signature song, "Dengan Menyebut Nama Allah" was a commercial success and boosted Dwiki's popularity. It entered the Aneka Top 13 Hits Indonesia chart at number seven, marking Kolopaking's only Islamic song to chart. The song received positive reviews from critics, who praised the lyrics. It has also been featured in various films and television series and covered by several artists of various genres including the band Gigi and internet celebrity Nagita Slavina.

== Background and composition ==
"Dengan Menyebut Nama Allah"
A sample of "Dengan Menyebut Nama Allah", demonstrating an emphasis on keyboards and choir-like vocals during the chorus.

The song's composer, Dwiki Dharmawan, revealed that it was inspired by Ags. Arya Dipayana's poems that he read in 1989. Shortly after, Dwiki and Arya Dipayana began writing "Dengan Menyebut Nama Allah", along with "Kepada Kesangsian". Then twenty-year-old singer and actress Novia Kolopaking recorded the former in 1993.

Musically, it is an Islamic song incorporates an emphasis on keyboards, "catchy" choir-like vocals during the chorus and "aesthetic" key modulation, with lyrics describing themselves to do better things in many ways.

== Credits and personnel ==
Credits adapted from the liner notes of Dengan Menyebut Nama Allah.

Studio

- Recorded at Mixmasters Studios, Jakarta
- Recorded at Musica Studios, Jakarta

Personnel

- Novia Kolopaking – lead vocals
- Dwiki Dharmawan – songwriting, production, arrangement
- Ags. Arya Dipayana – songwriting, production
- Herry Ramdhiana – operation
- Donny Lissapoly – operation

== Critical reception ==
"Dengan Menyebut Nama Allah" was met with generally positive reviews. (Note: Attributed to multiple references:) Hera Diani of The Jakarta Post describing it as the "most famous" song written by Dwiki. Susi Ivvaty, writing for Kompas, states that "Dengan Menyebut Nama Allah" has still received airplays and subsequently been covered extensively by many artists in a variety of styles on most occasions. Asti Prativi of the IDN Times described this song has "meaningfully simplified" lyrics. Joanna Purba of Rappler describes "Dengan Menyebut Nama Allah" as a song that "always played at many shopping malls every Ramadan".

== Commercial performance ==
"Dengan Menyebut Nama Allah" appeared on Top 10 Hits Indonesia chart on the 18 May 1993 issue of Aneka at number seven, boosting Dwiki and Arya Dipayana's popularity.

== Live performances ==
Kolopaking sang the song on several occasions. She performed "Dengan Menyebut Nama Allah" for performance in Semarak Takbir in 1997. The song was also part of Kolopaking's solo concert Hati Matahari in 2011, accompanied by Matarantai orchestra.

== Charts ==
=== Weekly charts ===
Weekly chart performances
| Charts (1993) | Peak position |
|---|---|
| Indonesia (Aneka) | 7 |

== Legacy ==
=== Adaptation ===
Dwiki and Ita released a children's book based on "Dengan Menyebut Nama Allah" in 1999.

=== Cover versions ===
Over half-dozen artists have remade "Dengan Menyebut Nama Allah", including those by Ita Purnamasari and Gigi.

=== Usage in media ===
Following the release of "Dengan Menyebut Nama Allah", the song has been used in many Indonesian films and television series, such as the 1995 film Regret and the 2000 Rapi Films-produced television drama Kabulkan Doaku.

== See also ==
- List of songs by Dwiki Dharmawan
