= Dwiki Dharmawan =

Indonesian composer, arranger, lyricist, conductor and orchestrator (born 1966)

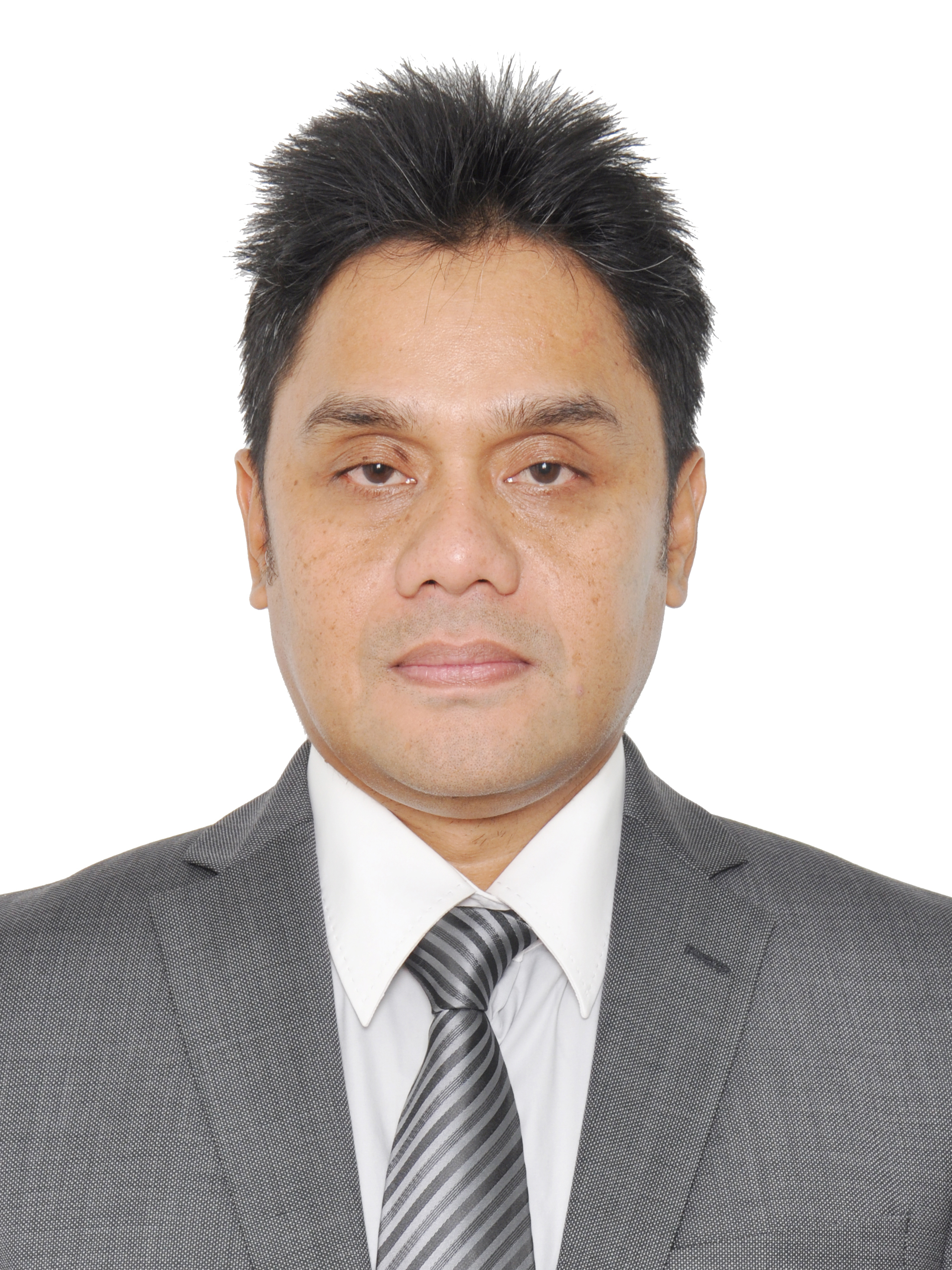
- Born: 19 August 1966 (age 60); Bandung, West Java, Indonesia
- Citizenship: Indonesian
- Occupations: Composer; lyricist; pianist; record producer; singer; actor
- Years active: 1982–present
- Notable work: "Dengan Menyebut Nama Allah"
- Political party: National Mandate (2014—2019)
- Spouse: Dyah "Ita" Purnamasari (m. 1995)
- Partner: Paramitha Rusady (1988–1990)
- Musical career
- Genres: Pop kreatif; classical crossover; fusion jazz; Islamic
- Instruments: Vocals; keyboard; piano
- Labels: Bulletin; Independent; HP; MoonJune
- Member of: Krakatau
- Website: dwikidharmawan.id

Dwiki Dharmawan (/dɑːrmɑːwɑːn/ or /dərmɑːwɑːn/; born 19 August 1966) is an Indonesian songwriter, record producer, and conductor. He began taking classical piano lessons at the age of six, then began writing songs and founding Krakatau with his bandmates Pra Budi Dharma and Donny Suhendra in high school. The band released their breakout single "Gemilang" in 1987, to critical success, selling over 800,000 copies.

After the break-up of Krakatau in 1990, Dwiki attempted to begin his solo career, released his first self-titled Indonesian album, Dwiki Dharmawan in 1991. One of his work, "Dengan Menyebut Nama Allah" which he co-wrote with Ags. Arya Dipayana in 1993, also received critical and commercial responses. Aside from writing songs for Krakatau and other artists, Dwiki also composed and conducted scores for films and television programs.

Dwiki's Indonesian discography includes four studio albums and one compilation album. He also ventured into the international music scene with the first five studio albums World Peace Orchestra (2009), So Far So Close (2015), Pasar Klewer (2016), Rumah Batu (The Stone House, 2018) and Hari Ketiga (Day Three, 2020). Dwiki have received numerous accolades, most notably the Citra Award for Best Original Score and the AMI Award for Best Jazz Album.

== Life and career ==
=== 1966–1990: Early life and Krakatau ===
Dwiki was born on 19 August 1966 in Bandung, West Java, Indonesia. He is the son of Yuniarti Sugatin and Safiyudin Sastrawijaya. He began taking classical piano lessons at the age of six. As a child, Dwiki often likes to singing and listening to children's songs. When he enters middle school at the age of thirteen, he started taking jazz music lessons. He later founded Krakatau in 1984, with his bandmates Pra Budi Dharma and Donny Suhendra. In 1986, the band has changed its formation in addition of Trie Utami, Indra Lesmana and Gilang Ramadhan. They released their breakout eponymous album including the title track "Gemilang" ("Dazzling") composed by Dwiki and written by film producer Mira Lesmana, which became a critical and commercial success, selling over 800.000 copies. In 1988, he began his soundtrack debut with Elegi Buat Nana. One of the songs that he written for the film, "Tiada Lagi Keraguan", entered domestic charts. In 1990, he rearranged the sound poetry "Aku Ingin" ("I Want") by artists Ags. Arya Dipayana and Sapardi Djoko Damono into a soundtrack for Garin Nugroho's film Cinta dalam Sepotong Roti (Love Is in a Slice of Bread).

=== 1991–1999 ===
==== Singing debut and "Dengan Menyebut Nama Allah" ====
In 1991, he began his singing debut with the release of his self-titled debut studio album, Dwiki Dharmawan, in which he sung the title track "Di Antara Harapan" ("Between the Wishes") featuring Irma Basuki, and "Sia-Sia Ku Menunggu" ("I'm So Futile to Wait for You"). Dwiki won the Citra Award for Best Original Score through Cinta dalam Sepotong Roti in the same year. In 1993, Dwiki and Arya Dipayana wrote their first Islamic song "Dengan Menyebut Nama Allah" ("Saying the Name of Allah"); the song, which recorded by singer Novia Kolopaking, became a critical success.

==== Music for television, re-establishment of Farabi and Tembang Peduli ====
In December 1994, he wrote and arranged the main theme for Bella Vista, titled "Impian Cinta" ("Dream of Love"), performed by Uchi Amyrtha and Iwan Zein. Later, he wrote and arranged "Deru Debu" ("Thundering Dust") for the series of the same name. In 1995, his composition "Dengan Menyebut Nama Allah" became the theme song for the film Sesal (Regret). That same year, Dwiki wrote "Tak Kan Hatiku Mendua" and won its first place at the year's Indonesian Pop Song Festival. The song, which recorded by Ina Rawie, became a number-one single on most Indonesian radio stations. Shortly after, he founded his own pops orchestra, the Dwiki Dharmawan Orchestra, with their first performance was an Eid Mubarak concert in that year. Dwiki also composed the score for many films and television programs, with the first series he scored to make use of string orchestra was Christ Helweldery's Harkat Wanita (A Woman's Trait) in 1996.

In June 1997, Dwiki provided the score for Bidadari Yang Terluka (A Wounded Angel), another series directed by Helweldery. He also wrote the title theme for the series with novelist Eddy D. Iskandar. In August of that year, he also re-established and reorganized the Farabi Music Education Center with his wife, Purnamasari, formerly owned by the late Jack Lesmana and his son, Indra. In September, Dwiki collaborated again with Iskandar, to wrote "Melangkah Di Atas Awan" ("A Walk in the Clouds") for the series of the same name, performed by Ronnie Sianturi. In 1998, he produced the charity album, Tembang Peduli, featured the song of the same name that he co-wrote with Dipayana. A year after, Dwiki and Purnamasari announced a children's book titled Dengan Menyebut Nama Allah based on his song of the same name. The book told the story of a young girl who cannot say Bismillah while doing anything else. At the 3rd Annual Anugerah Musik Indonesia, Dwiki won the Best Country/Ballad Songwriter category through his composition "Tembang Peduli".

=== 2000–2009: Asia Song Festival to World Peace Orchestra ===
Dwiki won the grand prize at the 2000 Asia Song Festival in the Philippines, through his composition "Biarlah Ku Simpan dalam Hati" ("I Let It Keep Inside My Heart"), performed by Rita Effendy. In November of the same year, his composition "Dengan Menyebut Nama Allah" resurged in popularity after it was featured in the Rapi Films Ramadan drama television series Kabulkan Doaku.

In 2002, he released his first instrumental album under Sony Music, Nuansa, which consists of his previously unreleased works in the last five years, from 1996 until 2001. On 4 August 2006, it was reported that Dwiki and his 99-piece orchestra would held an inaugural concert, Menembus Batas (Beyond the Limits), featuring popular singers and Islamic acts, like Melly Goeslaw, Opick, Sam Bimbo, Rachel Amanda, his wife Purnamasari, and Seurieus, accompanied by a 66-voice choir, which is a combination of the choirs of Padjajaran University, Farabi and ESQ. A year after, he founded his other international orchestra, the World Peace Orchestra. They performed at the Temecula Wine and Music Festival in California, United States, making the first time that the orchestra performed at the event.

=== 2013–present: Krakatau Reunion, international career and remakes ===
Dwiki's official logo since 2022

In 2013, it was announced that Dwiki return to perform with his band Krakatau for the first time since 1988, under the Krakatau Reunion banner, however the comeback plans have been cancelled.

On 25 February 2014, Dwiki released his first tribute album and his second album under the Sony Music label, Collaborating Harmony, which is consisting of ten remakes of his written songs and was worked in 2013 to commemorate his thirtieth anniversary of debut. In February 2015, Dwiki signed a contract with MoonJune Records to release his second international studio album and sixth overall, So Far So Close. Initially titled Passion, Love, Life, it was recorded in the United States in January, and recruited several musicians including the violinist Jerry Goodman, bass guitarist Jimmy Haslip, Chad Wackerman and Dewa Budjana. He later released his third international album, Pasar Klewer in 2016, to positive reviews from DownBeat and Jazzwise. In 2017, Dwiki performed a remake of "Dengan Menyebut Nama Allah" with Andini, which became a major commercial success. His third international album with MoonJune, Rumah Batu, released in April 2018. In June 2021, he rearranged and re-recorded "Deru Debu" as a single by his wife Purnamasari and then thirteen-year-old singer Zoe Jireh.

On 4 December 2024, Dwiki won an AMI Award for Best Instrumental Production Work, through its composition "The Spirit of Peace". In February 2025, he rearranged his religious song "Dengan Menyebut Nama Allah" with Indonesian singer Jinan Laetitia. Dwiki celebrated his quadragenary of debut in the same year with the concerts Parikrama Parahyangan in Bandung and The Musical Journey of Dwiki Dharmawan at the Ciputra Artpreneur, Lotte Mall Jakarta.

== Personal life ==
Dwiki married singer-songwriter Dyah "Ita" Purnamasari on 23 October 1995. They have a child, Muhammad Fernanda, born on 4 December 1997.

== Works ==
Dwiki wrote and composed many singles, some of which were used as theme songs for Indonesian films and television series: "Dengan Menyebut Nama Allah" was used for the film Sesal (Regret) and "Gemilang" was used for Kulari Ke Pantai (Run to the Beach).

== Artistry ==
Dwiki's music spans genres such as pop, classical, jazz and Middle Eastern music. His first compilation album Collaborating Harmony is predominantly pop that evokes "youthful musical trends".

== Cultural impact ==
=== Books ===
The 2009 novel by Wahyuningrat, Negeri Van Oranje, mentions Dwiki Dharmawan.

=== Covers and tributes ===
Numerous artists and musicians in Indonesia have recorded their own renditions of songs written by Dwiki. According to Kompas, "Dengan Menyebut Nama Allah" is the most covered song written by Dwiki. In 2014, Sony Music released its first tribute album to Dwiki, Collaborating Harmony: Dwiki Dharmawan, with contributions from various artists, including Shena Malsiana and the girl group Dalagita.

== Awards and nominations ==
Year	Award	Category	Work	Result	Ref.
1991	Indonesian Film Festival	Best Original Score	Cinta dalam Sepotong Roti	Won	
1999	Anugerah Musik Indonesia	Best Country or Ballad Songwriter	"Tembang Peduli"	Won	
2005	Bandung Film Festival	Best Original Score for Theatrical Movies	Of Love and Eggs	Won	
2005	Bandung Film Festival	Best Original Score for Theatrical Movies	Ketika	Nominated	
2012	Maya Awards	Top Music Director of the Year	The Blindfold	Nominated	
2016	Anugerah Musik Indonesia	Best Jazz Album	So Far So Close	Won	
2016	Anugerah Musik Indonesia	Best Jazz Artist	"So Far So Close"	Nominated	
2016	Anugerah Musik Indonesia	Best Instrumental Production Work	"So Far So Close"	Nominated	
2017	Anugerah Musik Indonesia	Best Vocal Jazz Artist	"Lir Ilir" (with Peni Candra Rini)	Nominated	
2017	Anugerah Musik Indonesia	Best Jazz Artist	"Frog Dance"	Nominated	
2017	Anugerah Musik Indonesia	Best Instrumental Production Work	"Frog Dance"	Nominated	
2018	Anugerah Musik Indonesia	Best Jazz Album	Rumah Batu	Nominated	
2018	Anugerah Musik Indonesia	Best Regional Language Production Work	"Impenan" (with Dewi Gita)	Nominated	
2018	Anugerah Musik Indonesia	Best World Music Production Work	"Impenan" (with Dewi Gita)	Won	
2021	Anugerah Musik Indonesia	Best Pop Music Production or Arrangement	"Deru Debu" performed by Ita Purnamasari, Dwiki Dharmawan & Zoe Jireh	Nominated	
2021	Anugerah Musik Indonesia	Best Collaborative Production Work	"Deru Debu" (with Ita Purnamasari & Zoe Jireh)	Nominated	
2021	Anugerah Musik Indonesia	Best Production Work for Remake	"Deru Debu" (with Ita Purnamasari & Zoe Jireh)	Nominated	
2021	Anugerah Musik Indonesia	Best Progressive Production Work	"The Earth"	Nominated	
2022	Anugerah Musik Indonesia	Best Instrumental Production Work	"Si Patokaan" (as part of Duo Kolintang)	Nominated	
2023	Anugerah Musik Indonesia	Top Orchestral Work of the Year	"Taubat" (with Aning Katamsi)	Nominated	
2024	Anugerah Musik Indonesia	Best Instrumental Production Work	"The Spirit of Peace" (as Dwiki Dharmawan World Peace Orchestra)	Won	

=== Other awards ===
- The Best Keyboard Player on Yamaha Light Music Contest (1985)
- 1995 Indonesian Pop Song Festival, for his song "Tak Kan Hatiku Mendua"
- Grand Prize at the Asia Song Festival (2000), for his song "Biarlah Ku Simpan dalam Hati"
- Nugraha Bhakti Musik Indonesia award from Persatuan Artis Penyanyi, Pencipta Lagu, dan Penata Musik Rekaman Indonesia (PAPPRI) (2011)
- WIPO Gold Medal for Creativity (2018)
