= Music of Indonesia =

Indonesia is a country with many different tribes and ethnic groups, and its music is also highly diverse, coming in hundreds of different forms and styles. Every region has its own distinct culture and art, and as a result traditional music differs from area to area. For example, each traditional type of music is often accompanied by its very own dance and theatre. Contemporary music scene has also been heavily shaped by various foreign influences, such as those from America, Britain, Japan, Korea, and India.

The music of Java, Kalimantan, Sumatra, Bali, Flores (Lesser Sunda Islands) and other islands have been well documented and recorded, and further research by Indonesian and international scholars is also ongoing. The music in Indonesia predates historical records, various Native Indonesian tribes often incorporate chants and songs accompanied with musical instruments in their rituals. The contemporary music of Indonesia today is also popular amongst neighbouring countries, such as Malaysia, Singapore and Brunei.

In general, the traditional music and songs of Indonesia comprise a strong beat and harmony with strong influence from Indian, Javanese, Arab, Chinese and Malay classical music. The influence is strongly visible in the popular traditional music genre of Dangdut.

== Musical instruments ==
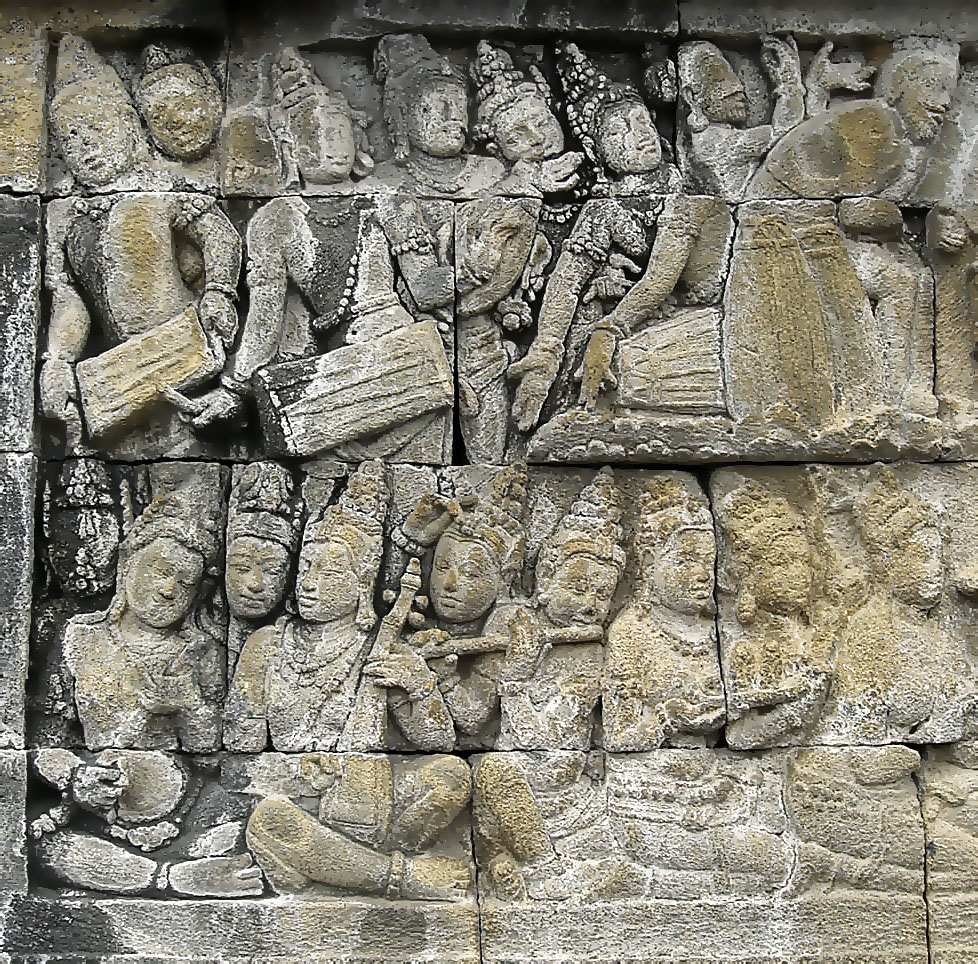
Musicians performing musical ensemble, The 8th century bas-relief of Borobudur Temple, Central Java, Indonesia

The musical identity of Indonesia as we know it today began as the Bronze Age culture migrated to the Indonesian archipelago in the 2nd-3rd century BC. Traditional musics of Indonesian tribes often uses percussion instruments, especially gongs and gendang (drums). Some of them developed elaborate and distinctive musical instruments, such as sasando string instrument of Rote island, angklung of Sundanese people, and the complex and sophisticated gamelan orchestra of Java and Bali.

Indonesia is the home of gong chime; 'gong chime' is a generic term for a set of small, high-pitched bossed pot gongs. The gongs are ordinarily placed in order of pitch, with the boss upward on cords held in a low wooden frame. The frames can be rectangular or circular (the latter are sometimes called "gong circles"), and may have one or two rows of gongs. They are played by one to four musicians, each using two padded sticks to strike them. They are an important instrument in many Indonesian musical ensembles, such as gamelan, kulintang, and talempong.

=== Gong ===
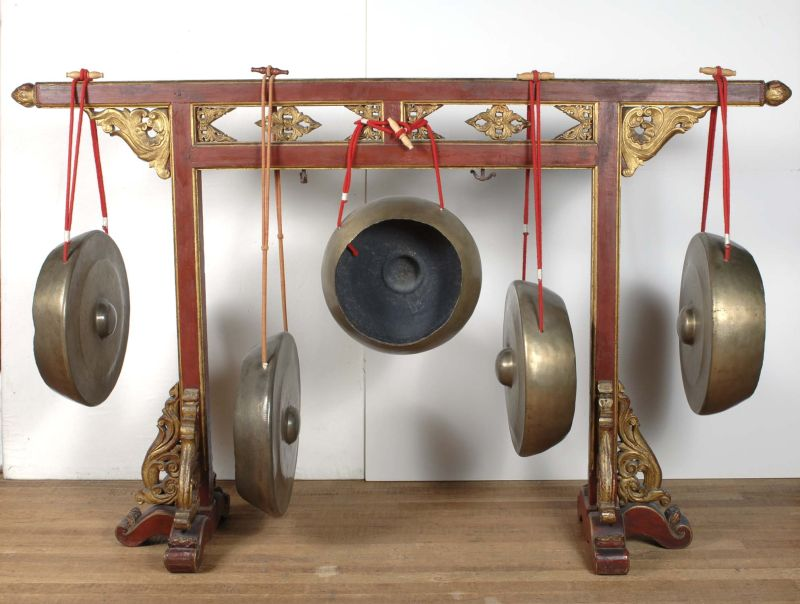
Indonesian kempul gong.

The gong is a mainly metallic percussion instrument family in various sizes originating from Southeast Asia. In Indonesia, it is usually used by gamelan ensembles.

=== Bonang and talempong ===
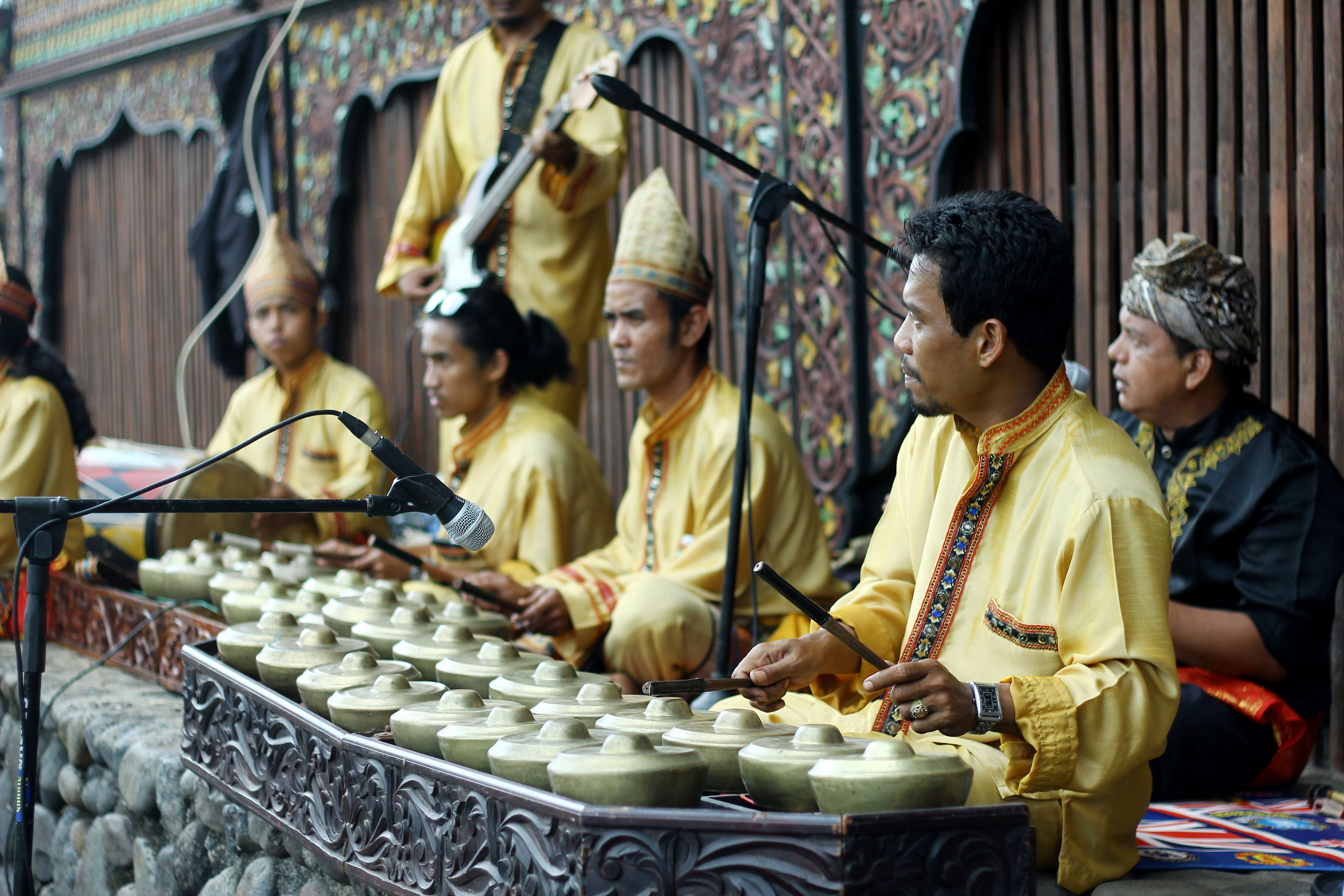
Talempong performance

The bonang is an instrument from the gong family used in the gamelan device. Talempong is a traditional instrument of the Minangkabau of West Sumatra with a shape almost the same as the bonang. Talempongs can be made of brass, but some are made of wood and stone. Talempongs are played by being hit using a wooden rod or a stick. Talempong is usually used to accompany dance or welcoming performances, such as the typical Tari Piring, Tari Pasambahan, Tari Alang, Tari Suntiang Pangulu and Tari Gelombang. Talempong is usually performed with an accordion accompaniment, a type of organ supported and played with the right hand. In addition to the accordion, instruments such as saluang, gandang, serunai and other traditional Minangkabau instruments are commonly played with talempong.

=== Kulintang ===
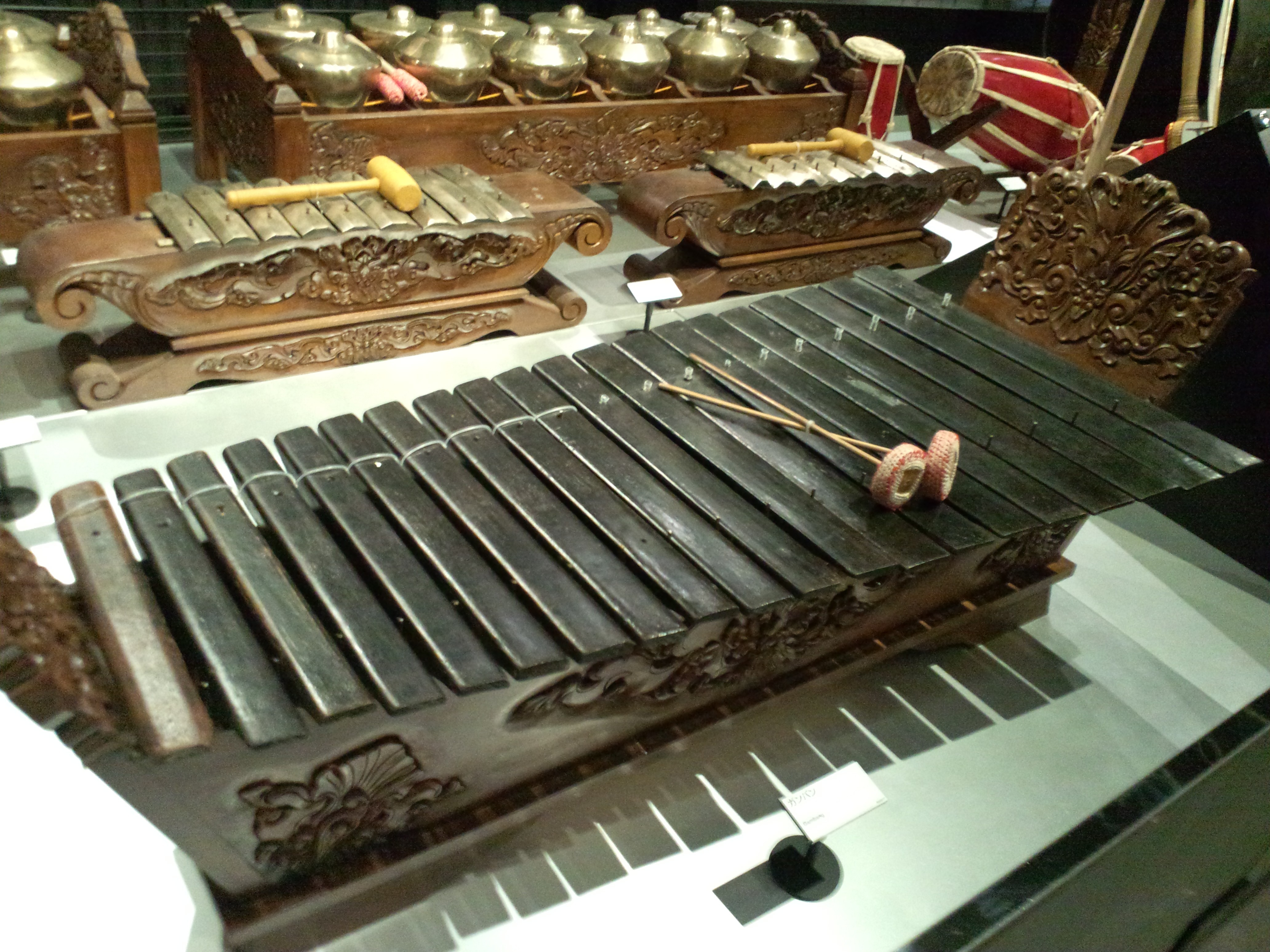
Replica of a kulintang musical instrument, similar to the Gambang.

Kolintang, or kulintang, is a bronze and wooden percussion instrument native to eastern Indonesia and also The Philippines. In Indonesia it is particularly associated with the Minahasa people of North Sulawesi; however, it is also popular in Maluku and Timor. The instrument consists of a row/set of 5 to 9 graduated pot gongs, horizontally laid upon a frame arranged in order of pitch with the lowest gong found on the players' left. The gongs are laid in the instrument face side up atop two cords/strings running parallel to the entire length of the frame, with bamboo/wooden sticks/bars resting perpendicular across the frame, creating an entire kulintang set called a "pasangan".

The main purpose for kulintang music in the community social entertainment at a professional, folk level. This music is unique in that it is considered a public music in the sense everyone is allowed to participate. Not only do the players play, but audience members are also expected to participate. These performances are important in that they bring people in the community and adjacent regions together, helping unify communities that otherwise may not have interacted with one another. Traditionally, when performers play kulintang music, their participation is voluntary. Musicians see performances as an opportunity to receive recognition, prestige and respect from the community and nothing more. Kulintang music differs in many aspects from gamelan music, primarily in the way the latter constructs melodies within a framework of skeletal tones and prescribed time interval of entry for each instruments. The framework of kulintang music is more flexible and time intervals are nonexistent, allowing for such things as improvisations to be more prevalent.

=== Angklung ===
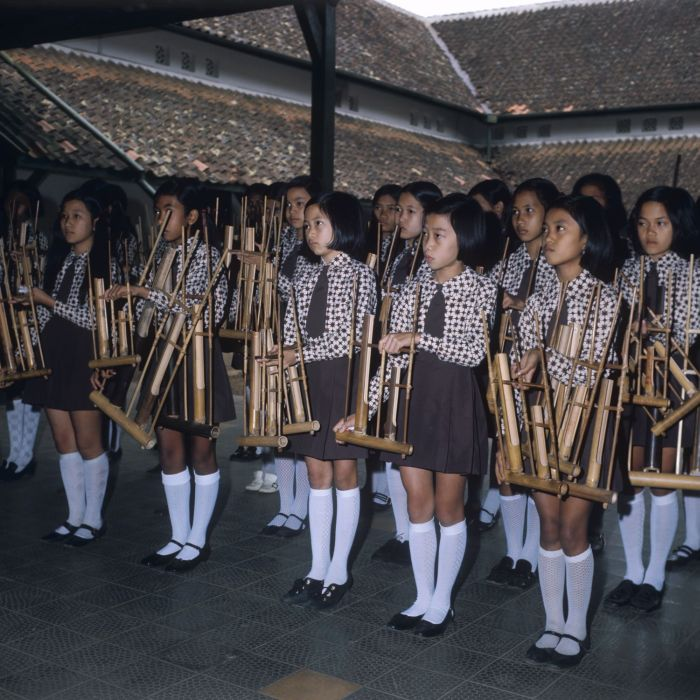
Angklung performance

Angklung is a bamboo musical instrument native to Sundanese people of West Java. It is made out of bamboo tubes attached to a bamboo frame. The tubes are carved so that they have a distinctive resonant pitch when being vibrated. Each angklung only plays one note. This musical instrument made of bamboo is played by shaking it. The sound of the Angklung is generated from the impact of bamboo tubes. It has a distinctive sound that vibrates in a composition of 2, 3, to 4 notes in each size.

Angklung existed before the Hindu era in Indonesia. In the days of the Sundanese kingdom (12th to 16th centuries), Angklung became a musical instrument that was always used in various events or celebrations, especially traditional events in farming. At that time, Angklung was played as worship of "Dewi Sri", namely the Goddess of Rice or the Goddess of Fertility to be given blessings to the plants she planted and also to prosper in life. Not only that, during the Sundanese kingdom, Angklung was also used as a trigger for the spirit of war.

The types of bamboo that are commonly used as musical instruments are black bamboo (awi wulung) and ater bamboo (awi temen), which when dry are whitish yellow. Each note (barrel) is produced from the sound of the bamboo tube in the form of a blade (wilahan) for each bamboo segment from small to large. Each bamboo size has a different pitch. UNESCO designated the angklung a Masterpiece of the Oral and Intangible Heritage of Humanity on 18 November 2010.

=== Suling ===
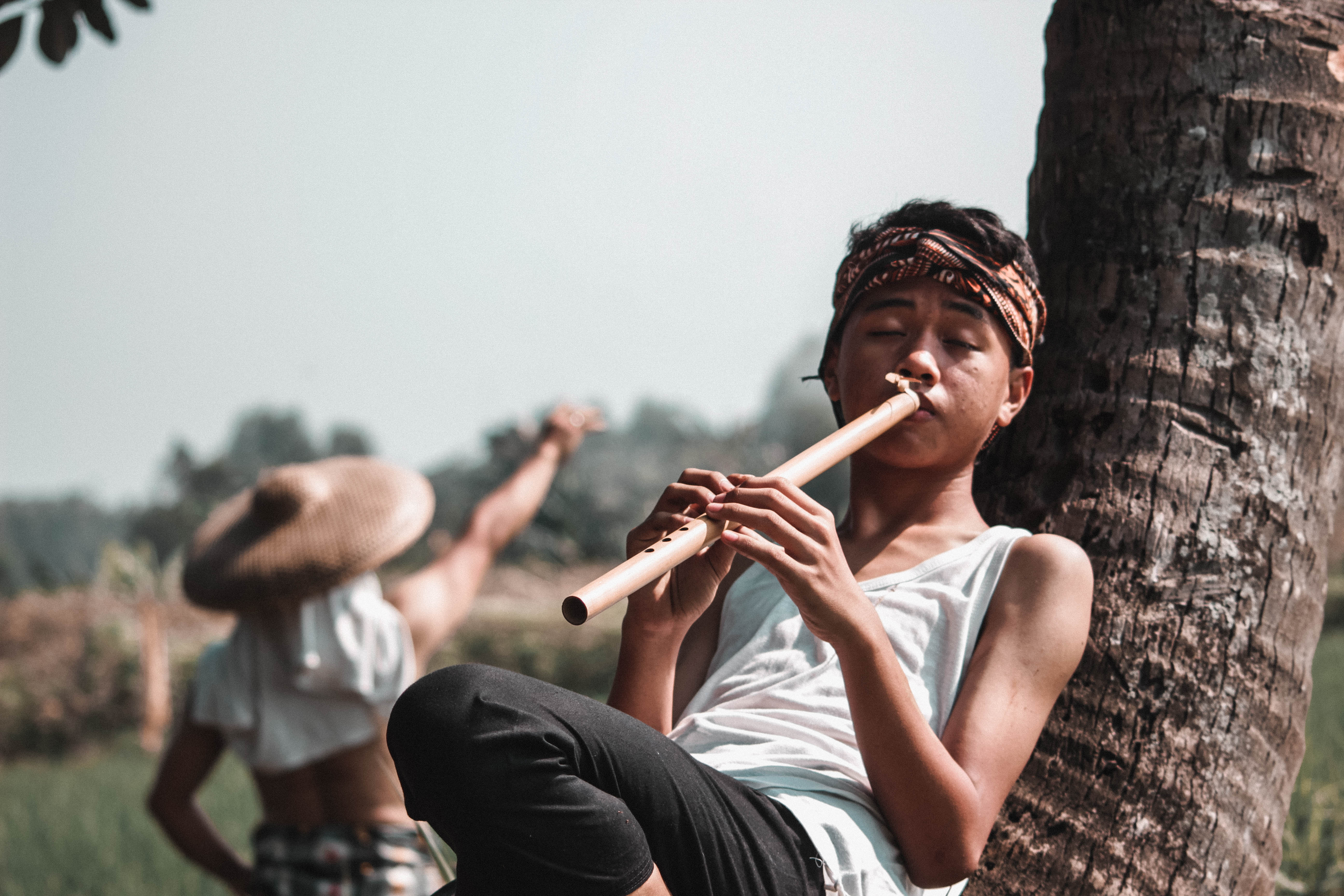
Boy playing suling

Suling is the Sundanese word for seruling the word of Indonesian, which means 'flute'. Made from bamboo, Indonesian flutes are always end blown and vary in size. The fingering position changes the wavelength of sound resonance inside the suling's body. Depending on the distance of nearest hole to the suling's head, different notes can be produced. The airflow speed also can modify the tone's frequency. A note with twice frequency can be produced mostly by blowing the air into suling's head's hole with twice speed. Generally, the shorter the suling the higher the pitch. This simple suling produces tunes or melodies that have traditionally been interpreted as the sound of joyful learning. There are many regions in Indonesia that use suling as a traditional instrument and have different local names for it. In Java, Sunda, and Bali, this instrument is commonly called suling, in Minang it is called saluang, in Toraja, it is called Lembang flute, in Halmahera, it is called bangsil, and in West Nusa Tenggara it is called silu. Suling is an Indonesian bamboo ring flute which is used in various traditional musical ensemble performances, including gamelan, gambus, and dangdut. This flute is made of a long, thin-walled bamboo tube called tamiang and a thin rattan band encircles the mouthpiece.

=== Kacapi suling ===
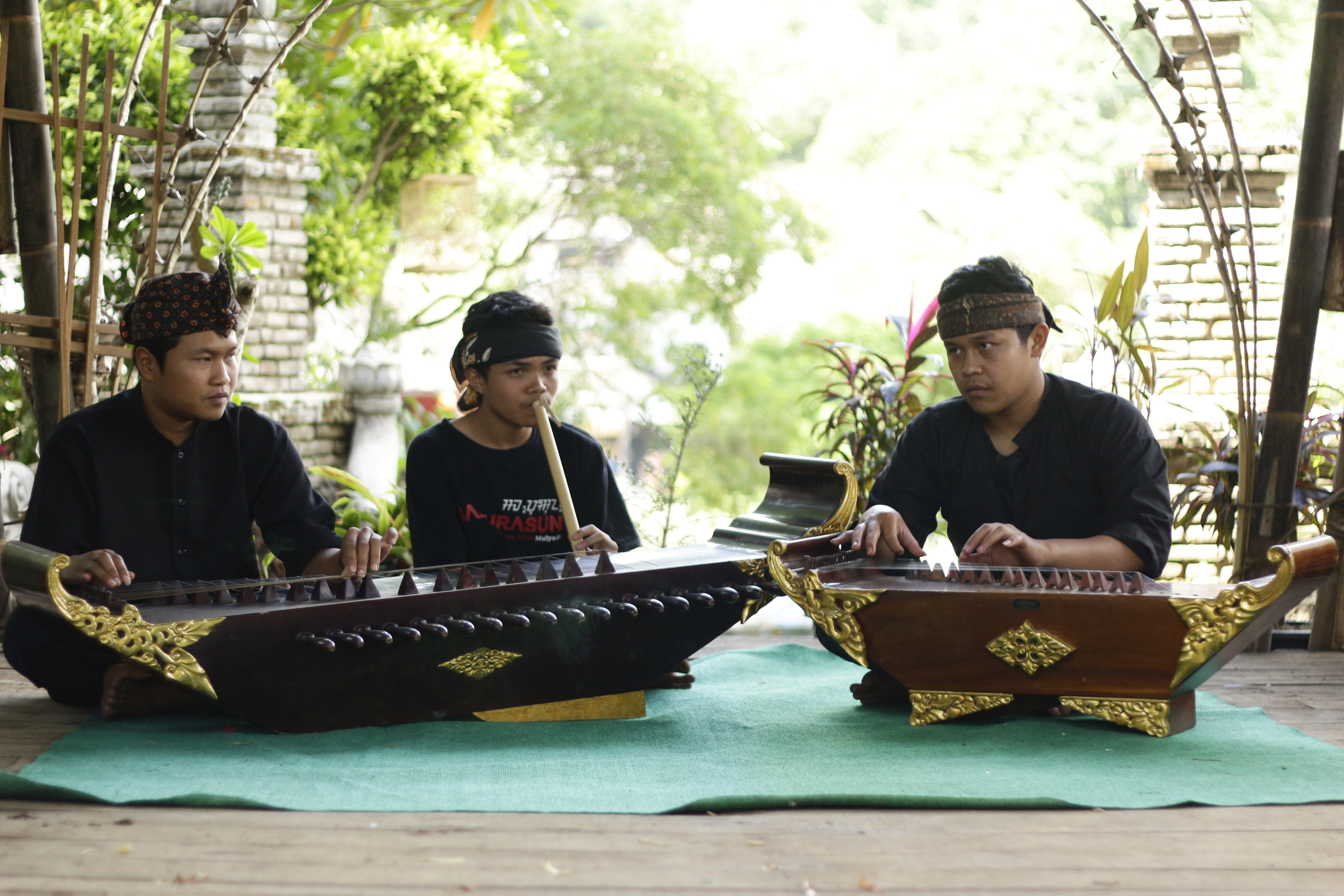
Sundanese men playing the Kecapi suling

Kacapi suling is a type of instrumental music that is highly improvisational and popular in parts of West Java that employs two instruments, kacapi (zither) and suling (bamboo flute). It is related to tembang sunda. The rhythmic strains of the kecapi are slow in tempo, produced by strings that blend into soft music when combined with the melody of the suling or melismatic vocals. The kacapi is a traditional zither of Sundanese musical instrument derived from the Chinese guzheng, and similar to the Japanese koto, the Mongolian yatga, the Korean gayageum, the Vietnamese đàn tranh and the Kazakh jetigen, and suling is a bamboo flute.

=== Kendang ===
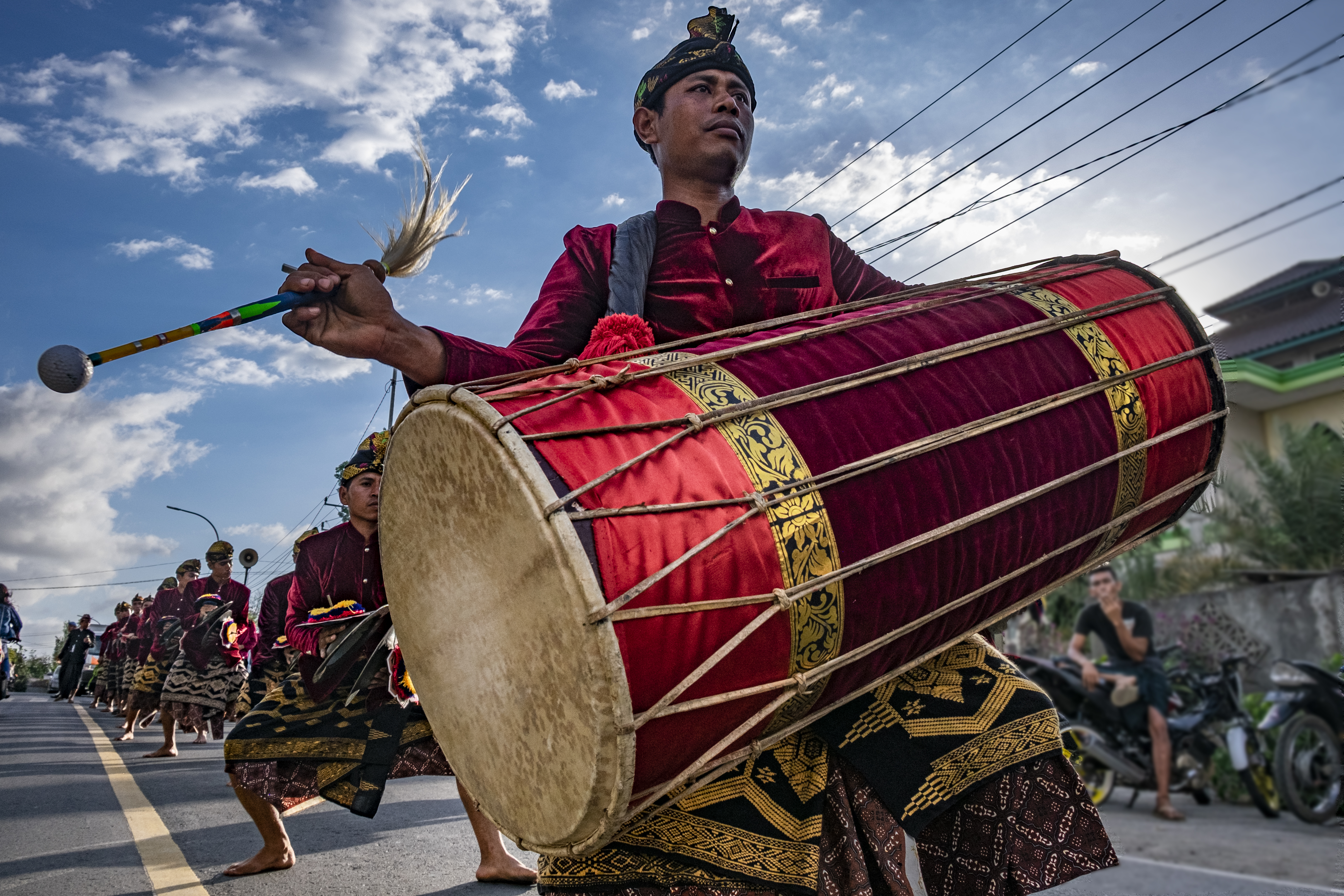
Gendang beleg performance in Lombok, West Nusa Tenggara.

Kendang or Gendang is a two-headed drum used by peoples from Indonesian archipelago. Among the Javanese, Sundanese, or Balinese peoples, the kendang has one side larger than the other, with the larger, lower-pitched side usually placed to the right, and are usually placed on stands horizontally and hit with the hands on either side while seated on the floor. Amongst groups like the Balinese both sides are of equal size, and are played on either one or both sides using a combination of hands and/or sticks. Among the Makassarese, the Ganrang drums have much more importance, with it considered the most sacred of all musical instruments, comparable to gongs in Java.

One of the best known variations of the Kendang is the Gendang beleq. Gendang beleq is a traditional music from Lombok island, Indonesia. The name gendang beleq is a Sasak language term, which means "big drum (big gendang)", as the performance is about a group of musicians playing, dancing and marching with their traditional instruments, centered on two big drum (gendang). The drum is made from a wood frame with goat skin drum-head. The wood is selected from woods which is hard yet light. In a Gendang beleq performance, the drummers carry and play gendang and dance a dramatic and confrontational duet. The drummers play interlocking tune with their large drums. Aside from able to play their instruments, the players must have the agility and stamina to perform the dance and marching with their instrument.

=== Sasando ===
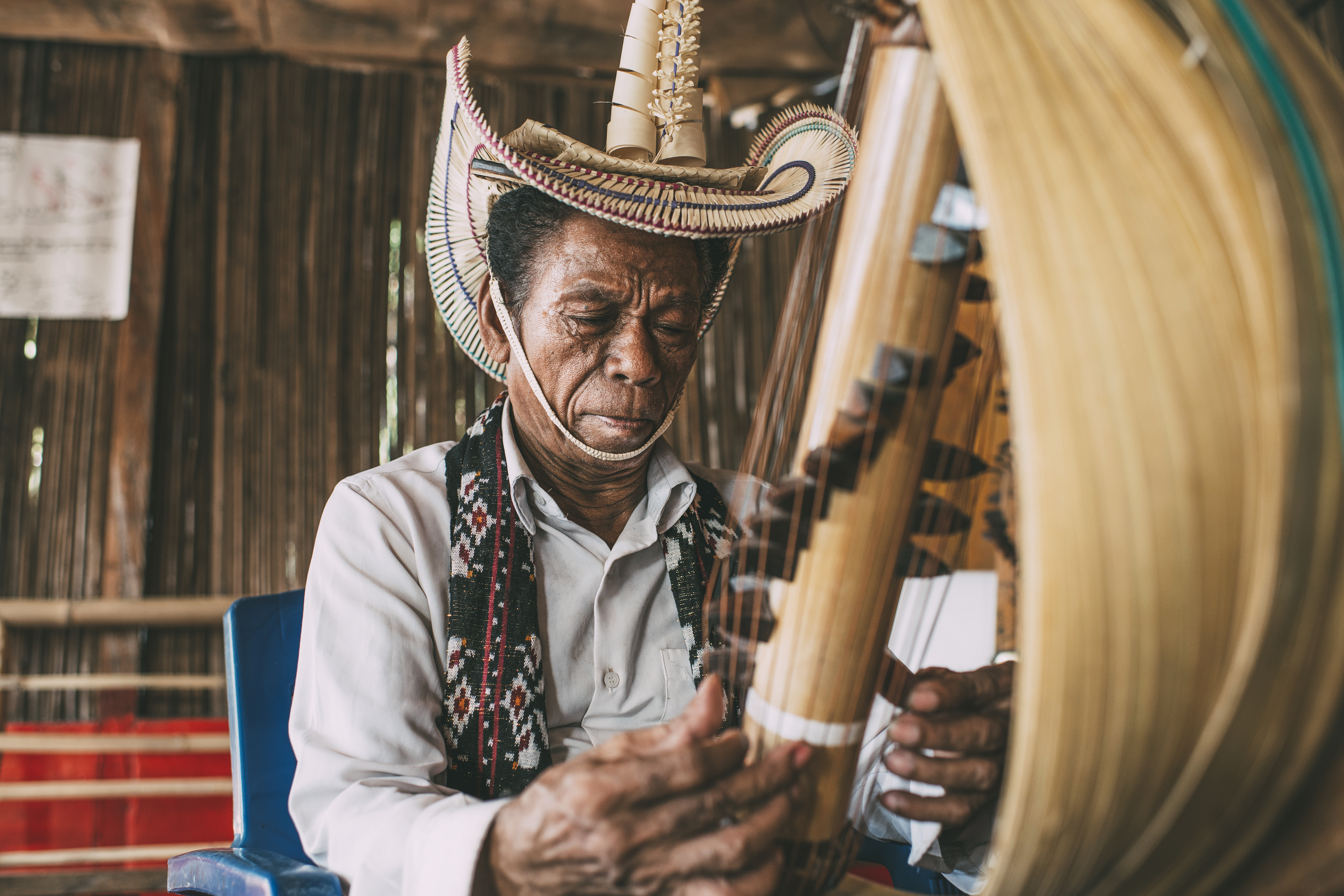
Man playing sasando

Sasando is a plucked string instrument native of Rote island of East Nusa Tenggara. The parts of sasando are a bamboo cylinder surrounded by several wedges where the strings are stretched, surrounded by a bag-like fan of dried lontar or palmyra leaves (Borassus flabellifer), functioned as the resonator of the instrument.

=== Tapanuli ogong ===
Musical performance from Tapanuli area of North Sumatra. Tapanuli ogong is a form of dance music played with a type of lute, trumpet and flute.

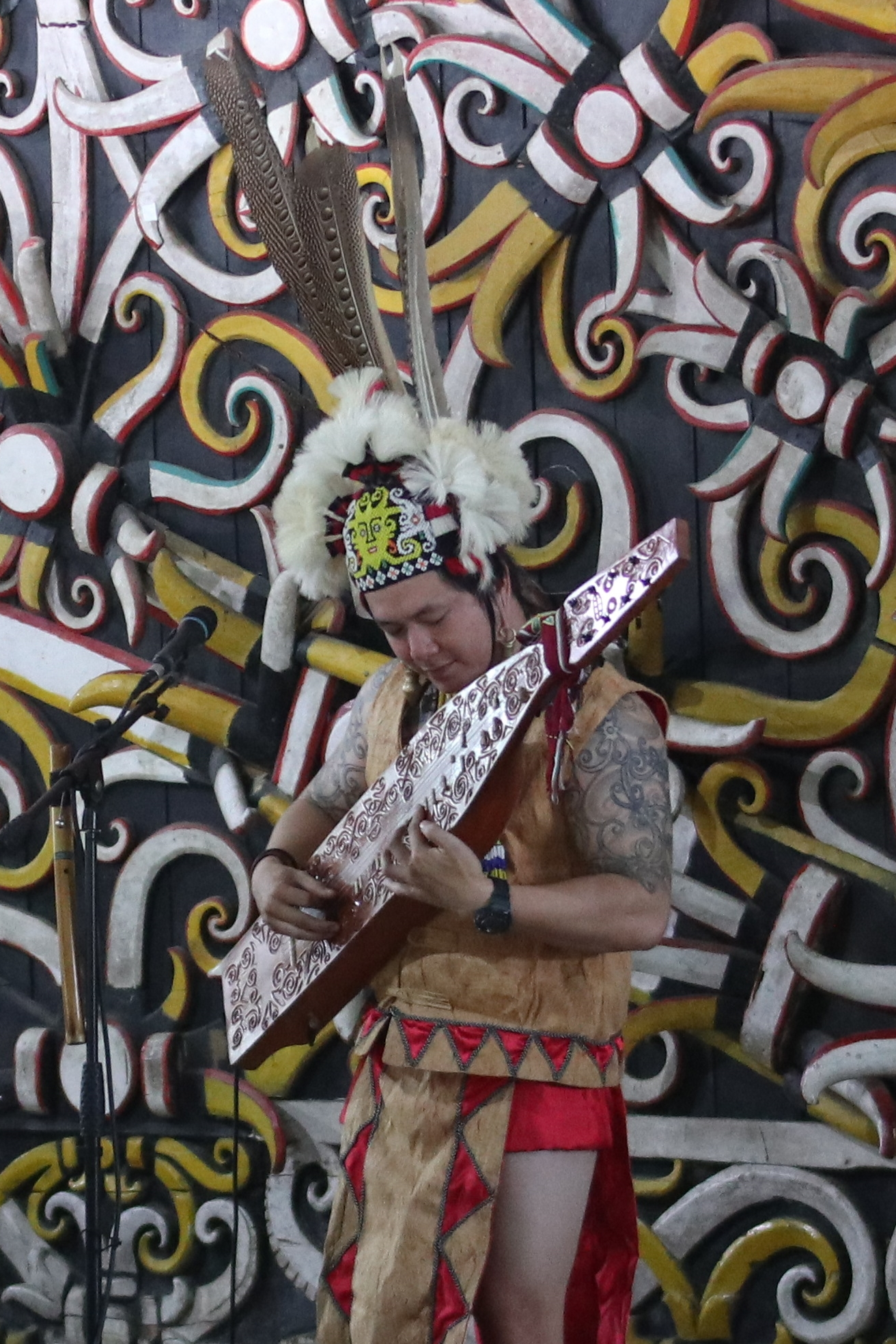
Man playing Sape

=== Sape Dayak ===
The sapeʼ (sampek, sampeʼ, sapek) is a traditional lute of the Kenyah and Kayan community who live in the longhouses that line the rivers of East Kalimantan, West Kalimantan and North Kalimantan. Sape' are carved from a single bole of wood, with many modern instruments reaching over a metre in length. Technically, the sape is a relatively simple instrument, with one string carrying the melody and the accompanying strings as rhythmic drones. In practice, the music is quite complex, with many ornamentations and thematic variations.

== Traditional genres ==
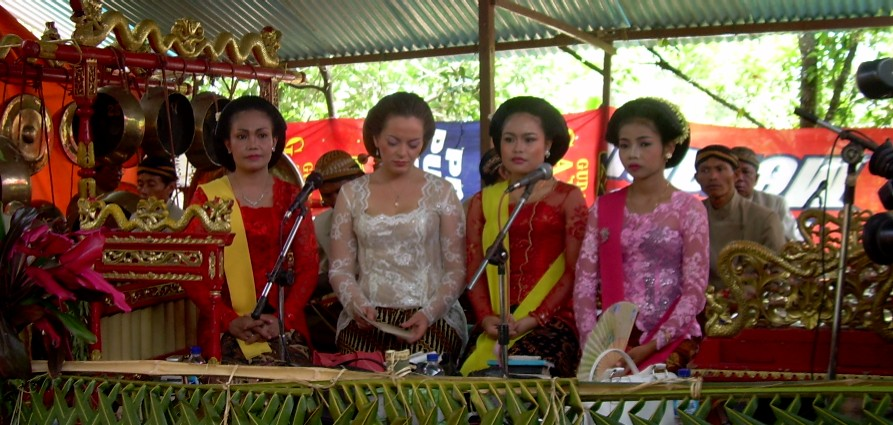
Javanese women singing with Sindhen style

The diversity of Indonesian music genres is the result of the musical creativity of its people, and also the subsequent cultural encounters with foreign musical influences into the archipelago. Alongside distinctive native forms of music, several genres can trace their origins to foreign influences; such as gambus and qasidah from Middle Eastern Islamic music, keroncong from Portuguese influences, and dangdut with notable Hindi music influence.

=== Folk music ===
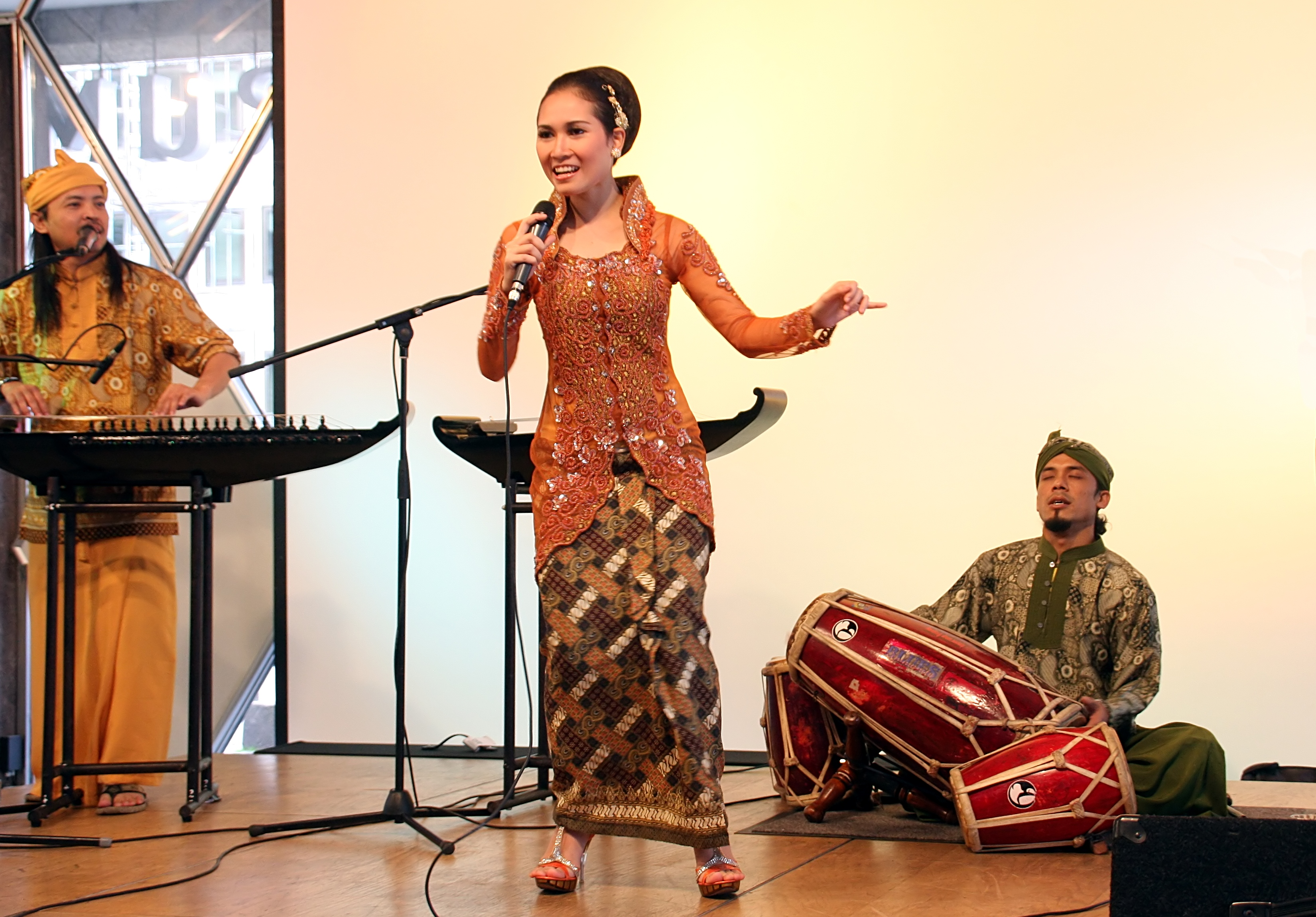
SambaSunda music performance, featuring traditional Sundanese music instruments.

Indonesian regional folk pop music reflects the diversity of Indonesian culture and Indonesian ethnicity, mostly use local languages and a mix of western and regional style music and instruments. Indonesian folk music is quite diverse, and today includes pop, rock, house, hip hop and other genres, as well as distinct Indonesian forms. There are several kinds of "ethnic" pop music, generally grouped together as Pop Daerah (regional pop). These include Pop sunda, Pop Minang, Pop Batak, Pop Melayu, Pop Ambon, Pop Minahasa and others. Other than featuring the legacy of Lagu Daerah (regional traditional songs) of each regional cultures, musicians also create some new compositions in their own native language.

=== Gamelan ===
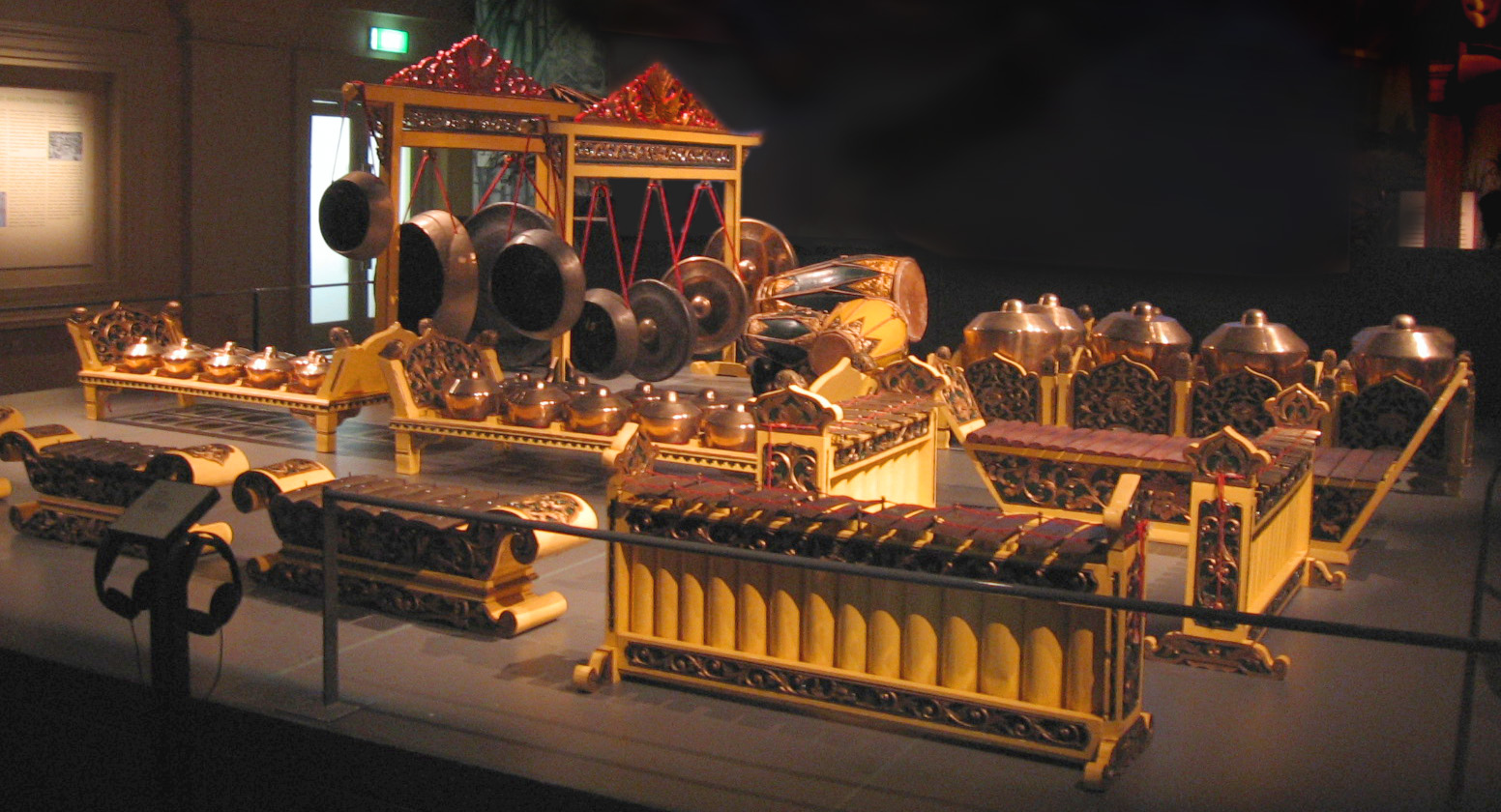
Javanese gamelan in Asian Civilisations Museum, Singapore

Gamelan xylophone solo.

The most popular and famous form of Indonesian music is probably gamelan, an ensemble of tuned percussion instruments that include metallophones, drums, gongs and spike fiddles along with bamboo flutes. Similar ensembles are prevalent throughout Indonesia, Singapore and Malaysia, however gamelan is originated from Java, Bali, and Lombok.

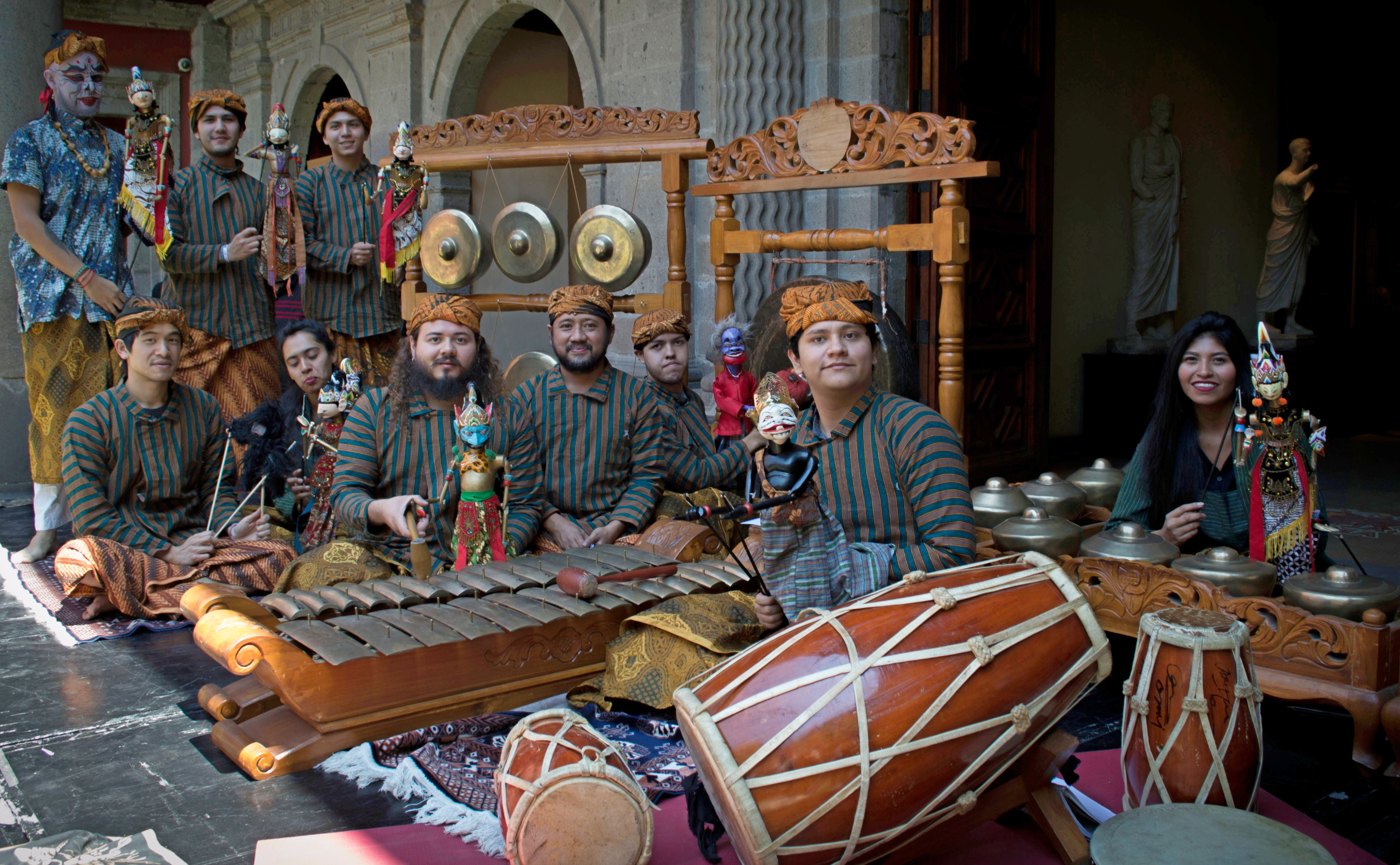
The Sundanese Degung gamelan performance in Museo Nacional de las Culturas Mexico, Indra Swara group.

In central Java, gamelan is intricate and meticulously laid out. The central melody is played on a metallophone in the centre of the orchestra, with the front elaboration and ornamentation on the melody, and at the back, the gongs slowly punctuate the music. There are two tuning systems. Each gamelan is tuned to itself, and the intervals between notes on the scale vary between ensembles. The metallophones cover four octaves, and include types like the slenthem, demung, saron panerus and balungan. The soul of the gamelan is believed to reside in the large gong, or gong ageng. Other gongs are tuned to each note of the scale and include ketuk, kenong and kempul. The front section of the orchestra is diverse, and includes rebab, suling, siter, bonang and gambang. Male choruses (gerong) and female (pesindhen) solo vocalists are common. With the arrival of the Dutch colonisers, a number system called kepatihan was developed to record the music. Music and dance at the time were divided into several styles based on the main courts in the area—Surakarta, Yogyakarta, Pakualaman and Mangkunegaran.

Gamelan in eastern Java is less well-known than central or western parts of the island. Perhaps most distinctive of the area is the extremely large gamyak drum. In West Java, formerly Sunda, has several types of gamelan. Gamelan Degung, gamelan salendro and tembang sunda are three primary types. The Osing Javanese minority in eastern Java are known for social music for weddings and other celebrations called gandrung, as well as angklung, played by young amateur boys, which is very similar to Balinese gamelan.

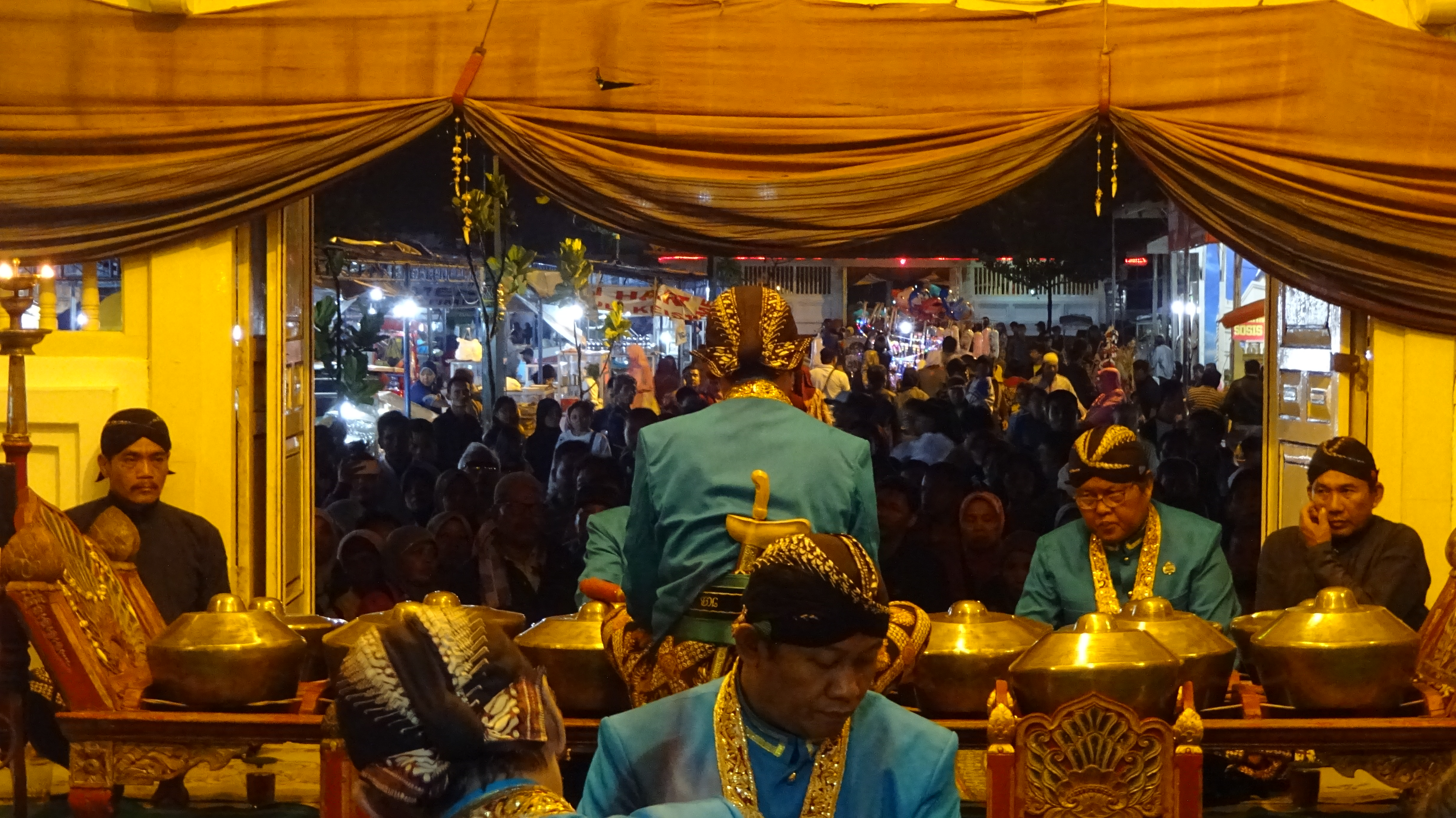
Gamelan Sekaten Kanjeng Kiai Guntur Madu (One of Some Javanese Sacred Gamelan) is usually beaten every day for a week during the Sekaten celebration at the Keraton Yogyakarta.

In Indonesia, gamelan often accompanies dance, wayang puppet performances, or rituals and ceremonies. Typically players in the gamelan will be familiar with dance moves and poetry, while dancers are able to play in the ensemble. In wayang, the dalang (puppeteer) must have a thorough knowledge of gamelan, as he gives the cues for the music. Gamelan can be performed by itself – in "klenengan" style, or for radio broadcasts – and concerts presentation are common in national arts conservatories founded in the middle of the 20th century.

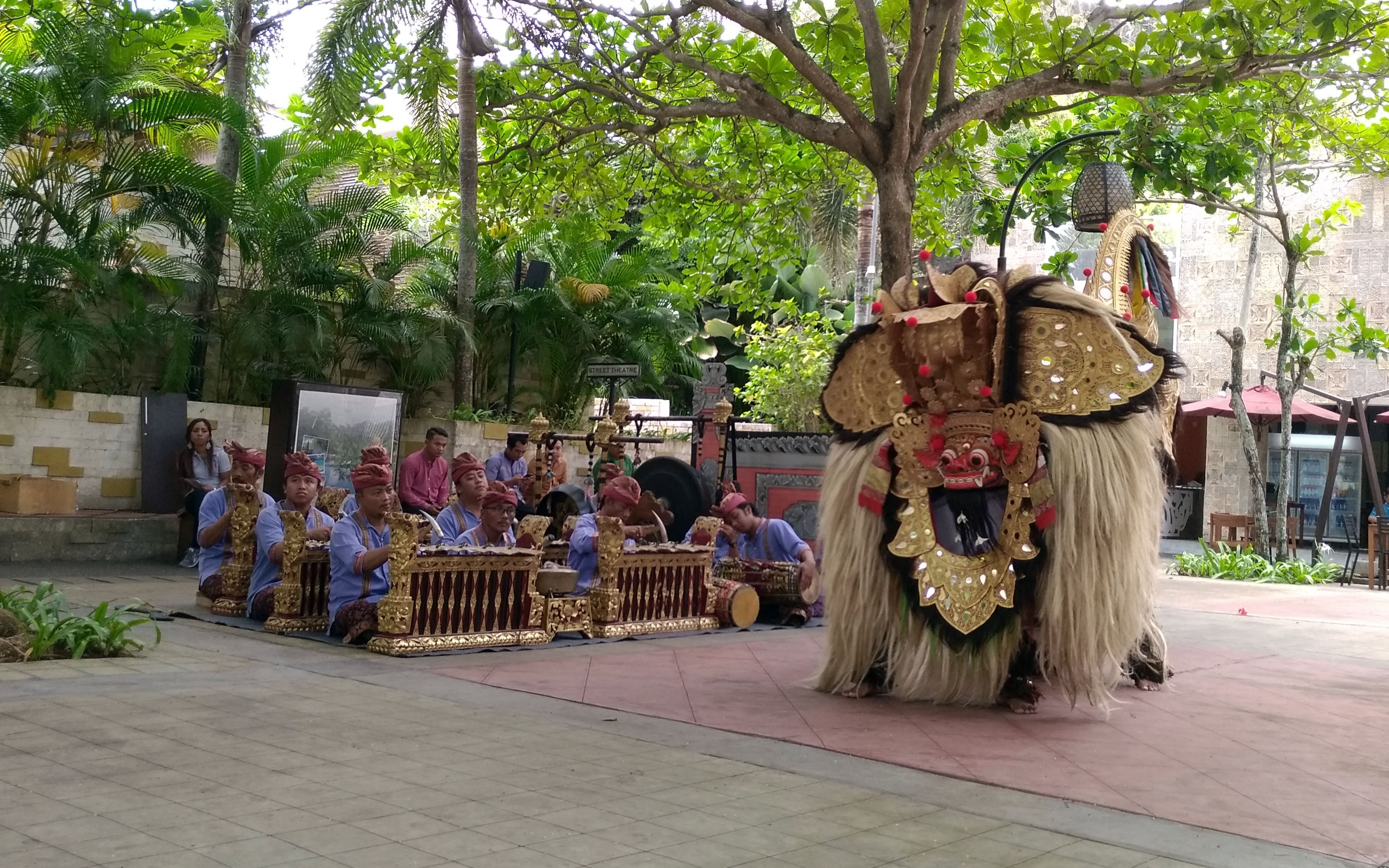
Gamelan ensemble (or gambelan in Balinese term) accompanying barong.

Gamelan's role in rituals is so important that there is a Javanese saying, "It is not official until the gong is hung". Some performances are associated with royalty, such as visits by the sultan of Yogyakarta. Certain gamelans are associated with specific rituals, such as the Gamelan Sekaten, which is used in celebration of the Mawlid (Muhammad's birthday). In Bali, almost all religious rituals include gamelan performance. Gamelan is also used in the ceremonies of the Catholic church in Indonesia. Certain pieces are designated for starting and ending performances or ceremonies. When an "ending" piece (such as "Udan Mas") is begun, the audience will know that the event is nearly finished and will begin to leave. Certain pieces are also believed to possess magic powers, and can be used to ward off evil spirits.

=== Tembang Sunda ===
Tembang sunda, also called "seni mamaos cianjuran", or just cianjuran, is a form of sung poetry which arose in the colonial-era of Cianjur. It was first known as an aristocratic art; one cianjuran composer was R.A.A. Kusumahningrat (Dalem Pancaniti), ruler of Cianjur (1834–1862). The instruments of Cianjuran are kacapi indung, kacapi rincik and suling or bamboo flute, and rebab for salendro compositions. The lyrics are typically sung in free verse, but a more modern version, panambih, is metrical.

=== Jaipongan ===
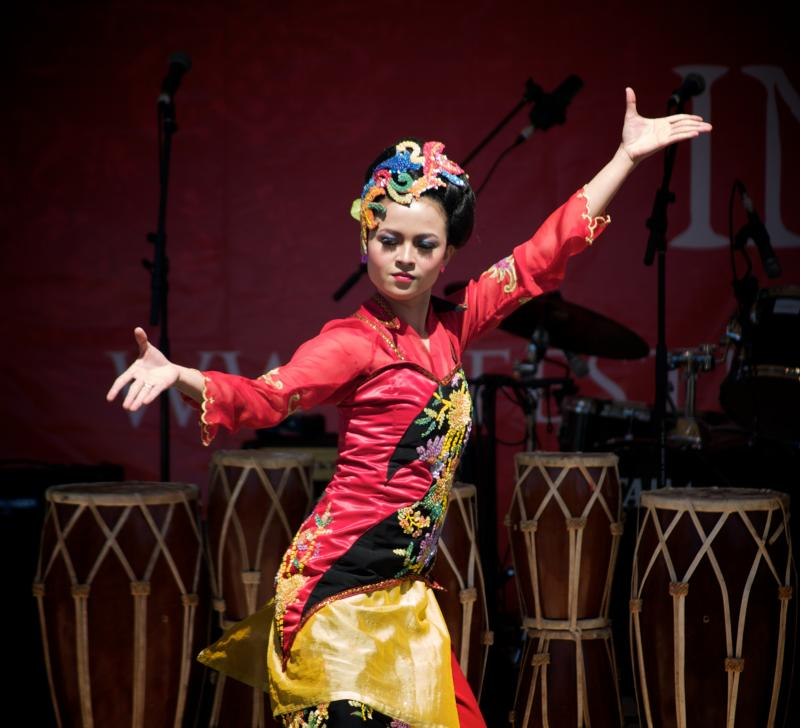
Jaipongan dance performance

Jaipongan is a very complex rhythmic dance music from the Sundanese people of western Java. The rhythm is liable to change seemingly randomly, making dancing difficult for most listeners. Its instruments are entirely Sundanese, completely without imported instruments. It was invented by artists like Gugum Gumbira after Sukarno prohibited rock and roll and other western genres in the 1960s.

=== Gambus ===
Gambus literally means oud, referring to a type of lute or 12-string pear-shaped guitar, is the Middle-Eastern-derived Islamic vocal and instrumental music. These traditions began to be incorporated throughout many areas of Indonesia by the 16th century.

=== Qasidah modern ===
Qasidah is an ancient Arabic word for religious poetry accompanied by chanting and percussion. Qasidah modern adapts this for pop audiences. It is used to denote a type of orchestra and the music it plays, believed to be introduced by Muslim settlers from Yemen. Qasidah modern were derived from Islamic pop, adding local dialects and lyrics that address Indonesian contemporary issues. Though popular among Arabs in Indonesia, it has gained little popularity elsewhere. One of the oldest qasidah modern musical groups in Indonesia is Nasida Ria.

The contemporary form of Islamic Middle Eastern-influenced music in Indonesia is exemplified by the band Debu, that feature a sufism approach on music to spread their message.

=== Nasheed ===
In Indonesia, as a predominantly Muslim country, many singers perform tradisional or contemporary nasheed, a genre of Islamic vocal music, either primarily or in addition to their repertoire.

=== Kroncong ===
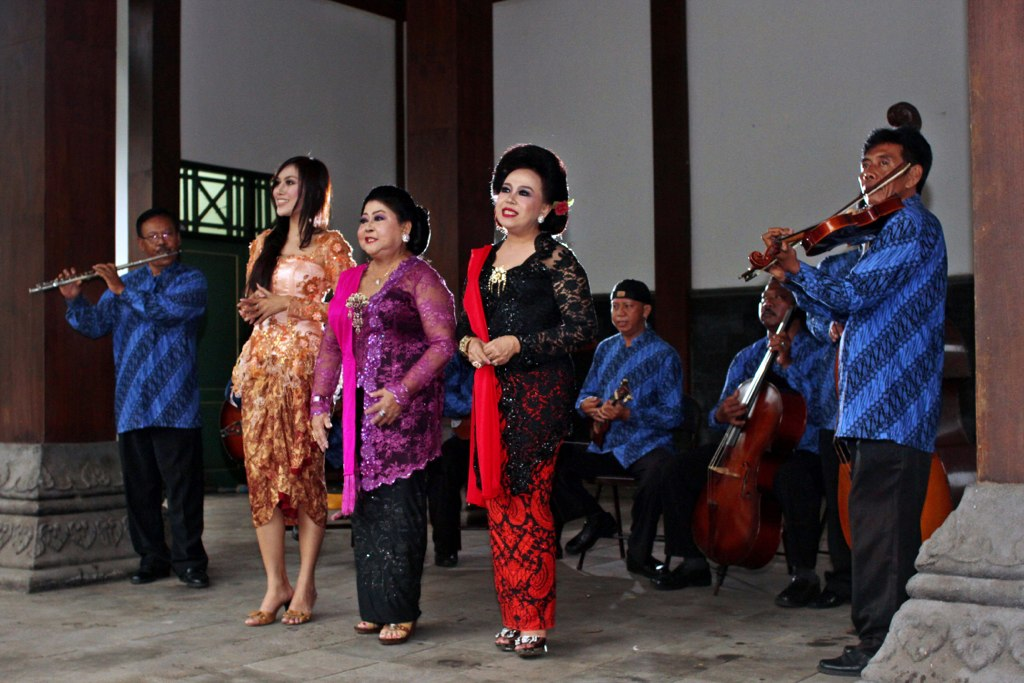
Keroncong singer, Waldjinah in a kroncong performance at the 55th Tong Tong Fair at The Hague in 2013.

Kroncong (alternative spelling: Keroncong) has been evolving since the arrival of the Portuguese, who brought European instruments. By the early 1900s, it was considered a low-class urban music. This changed in the 1930s, when the rising Indonesian film industry began incorporating kroncong. And then even more so in the mid- to late 1940s, it became associated with the struggle for independence.

Perhaps the most famous song in the kroncong style is "Bengawan Solo", written in 1940 by Gesang Martohartono, a Solonese musician. Written during the Japanese Imperial Army occupation of the island in World War II, the song (about the Bengawan Solo River, Java's longest and most important river) became widely popular among the Javanese, and then later nationally when recordings were broadcast over the local radio stations. The song also became quite popular with the Japanese soldiers, and when they returned to Japan at the end of the war re-recordings of it (by Japanese artists) became best-sellers. Over the years it has been re-released many times by notable artists, mainly within Asia but also beyond (like Anneke Grönloh), and in some places it is seen as typifying Indonesian music. Gesang himself remains the most renowned exponent of the style, which although it is seen now as a somewhat starchy and "dated" form is still popular among large segments of the population, particularly the older generation.

After World War II, during Indonesian National Revolution (1945–1949), and since then, kroncong has been associated with patriotism, since many Indonesian poets and patriotic songwriters use kroncong and jazz fusion genres in their works. Patriotic themes and romantic wartime romance were featured in the works of Ismail Marzuki, such as "Rayuan Pulau Kelapa", "Indonesia Pusaka", "Sepasang Mata Bola", "Keroncong Serenata" and "Juwita Malam". These patriotic songs can be sung in hymn or even in orchestra, but are most often sung in kroncong style, known as kroncong perjuangan (struggle kroncong). The kroncong divas; Waldjinah, Sundari Sukoco and Hetty Koes Endang, were instrumental in reviving the style in the 1980s.

=== Langgam Jawa ===
There is a style of kroncong native to Surakarta (Solo) called langgam jawa, which fuses kroncong with the gamelan seven-note scale, adopted from its original keroncong.

=== Gambang kromong ===
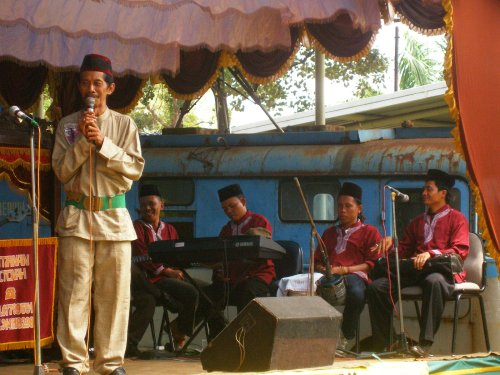
Gambang kromong, a music performed on melodic percussion instruments and brass, is native to the Indonesian capital of Jakarta.

Early in the 20th century, kroncong was used in a type of theatre called Komedi Stambul; adapted for this purpose, the music was called gambang kromong. Gambang kromong is quite prevalent in the Betawi culture of Jakarta.

=== Tanjidor ===
Tanjidor is a traditional Betawi musical ensemble of Jakarta. The instruments used are similar to that of a military marching band apt corps of drums/drum and bugle corps, usually consisting of tuba or sousaphone, trumpet, clarinet, tambourine and drums. The term tanjidor was derived from Portuguese tanger (playing music) and tangedor (playing music outdoors), subsequently adopted in Betawi language as tanji (music). Other than Jakarta, tanjidor musical ensemble can also be found in Pontianak, West Kalimantan.

== Contemporary genres ==
The contemporary music of Indonesia is diverse and vibrant. Throughout its history, Indonesian musicians were open to foreign influences of various music genres of the world. American jazz was heavily marketed in Asia, and foxtrots, tangos, rumbas, blues and Hawaiian guitar styles were all imitated by Indonesian musicians. As the result, various genres were developed within Indonesian music frame: Indonesian pop, rock, gospel, jazz, R&B, and hip hop.

Indonesian music also plays a vital role in the Indonesian creative pop culture, especially as the soundtracks or theme songs of Indonesian cinema and sinetrons (Indonesian TV drama). For example, Indonesian film Badai Pasti Berlalu (1977), a produced successful soundtrack hit of the same name. In 1999, the soundtrack was remade with Chrisye as the main singer and rendered by Erwin Gutawa in orchestra style, and in 2007, the film was remade again with a new soundtrack featuring the same songs performed by new artists. In the 1990s, Dwiki Dharmawan wrote theme songs for the television series Bella Vista (1994), Deru Debu (1994) and Bidadari Yang Terluka (1997); the latter was performed by Ita Purnamasari. Another popular Indonesian teen film titled What's Up with Love? (Ada Apa Dengan Cinta?; 2002) also produced hits from its soundtrack, with most songs written and performed by Melly Goeslaw.

In the late 1990s, within Indonesian popular music, contemporary Islamic songs emerged, with performers making music as a tool for preaching. The main genres are nasheed (Aa Gym), Islamic rock (Ahmad Dhani and Dewa 19), and fusion style (Cak Nun and Kiai Kanjeng).

Today, the Indonesian music industry enjoys nationwide popularity. Thanks to common culture and mutually intelligible languages between Indonesian and Malay, Indonesian music also enjoys regional popularity in neighbouring countries such as Malaysia, Singapore and Brunei. However, the overwhelming popularity of Indonesian music in Malaysia has alarmed the Malaysian music industry. In 2008 Malaysian music industry demanded the restriction of Indonesian songs on Malaysian radio broadcasts.

=== Orchestra and classical music ===
Western classical music reached Indonesia in the era of Dutch East Indies as early as the 18th century, but it was enjoyed only by a handful of wealthy Dutch plantation owners and officers in elite social clubs and ballrooms such as Societeit Harmonie in Batavia and Societeit Concordia in Bandung. De Schouwburg van Batavia (today Gedung Kesenian Jakarta) was designed as a concert hall in the 19th century. Classical music had been restricted to the refined, wealthy and educated high-class citizen, and never penetrated the rest of the population during the East Indies colonial era. The type of western-derived music that transcended the social barrier at that time was Kroncong, known as lower-class music.

An amateur group called Bataviasche Philharmonic Orchestra was established in Dutch colonial times. It became the NIROM orchestra when the radio broadcasting station Nederlandsch-Indische Radio Omroep Maatschappij was born in 1912. Today it is known as Jakarta Symphony Orchestra, which has existed in the country's musical world for almost a century through its changing formats to suit prevailing trends and needs. In 1950, a merger of the Cosmopolitan Orchestra under Joel Cleber, and the Jakarta Studio Orchestra under Sutedjo and Iskandar appeared as the Djakarta Radio Orchestra under Henkie Strake for classical repertoires, and the Jakarta Studio Orchestra led by Syaiful Bachri specialised in Indonesian pieces. In 2010 Jakarta Symphony Orchestra staged a comeback after a fairly long absence. The Jakarta Symphony was emerged in '70s.

From the 1960s to the 1980s, classical music in Indonesia aired on the national radio broadcasting service, Radio Republik Indonesia (RRI), and the national TV station Televisi Republik Indonesia (TVRI). During these decades, classical orchestra mainly developed in universities as an extracurricular activity for students which included choir. In the 1990s, professional symphony orchestras started to take form, such as the Twilite Orchestra led by Addie MS, founded in June 1991. Initially an ensemble with 20 musicians, the ensemble has since developed into a full symphonic orchestra with 70 musicians, a 63-member Twilite Chorus, and a repertoire that ranges from Beethoven to The Beatles. The orchestra has played a role in promoting Indonesian music, especially in the preservation of national songs by Indonesian composers, and traditional songs. Aided by the Victorian Philharmonic Orchestra with the Twilite Chorus, Addie MS re-recorded the Indonesian national anthem, Indonesia Raya, by WR Supratman in its original orchestral arrangement by Jos Cleber, as well as other Indonesian popular national songs in the album Simfoni Negeriku.

An Indonesian composer who is well known in contemporary classical music is Ananda Sukarlan (born 1968), with many orchestral works, chamber and instrumental. His most celebrated works are a series of virtuosic Rapsodia Nusantara for piano solo, with musical motifs based on Indonesian folktunes. He has written works for musicians such as from the Boston Symphony Orchestra, violinist Midori Goto etc., and his works are widely performed worldwide.

Today, major cities like Jakarta, Bandung, Yogyakarta, Surabaya, Medan and Batam are no strangers to orchestral music, with their own symphony groups. Jakarta, for instance, has its Nusantara Symphony Orchestra, the Twilite Orchestra and the Jakarta Concert Orchestra.

Among contemporary Indonesian musicians who associated with classical music are: the composers Ananda Sukarlan and Sinta Wullur; the pianists Hendry Wijaya, Eduardus Halim, Esther Budiardjo, and Victoria Audrey Sarasvathi; the flautist Embong Rahardjo; the soprano singers Pranawengrum Katamsi, Aning Katamsi, and Isyana Sarasvati (she is also successful pop sentimental ballad vocalist).

=== Pop ===
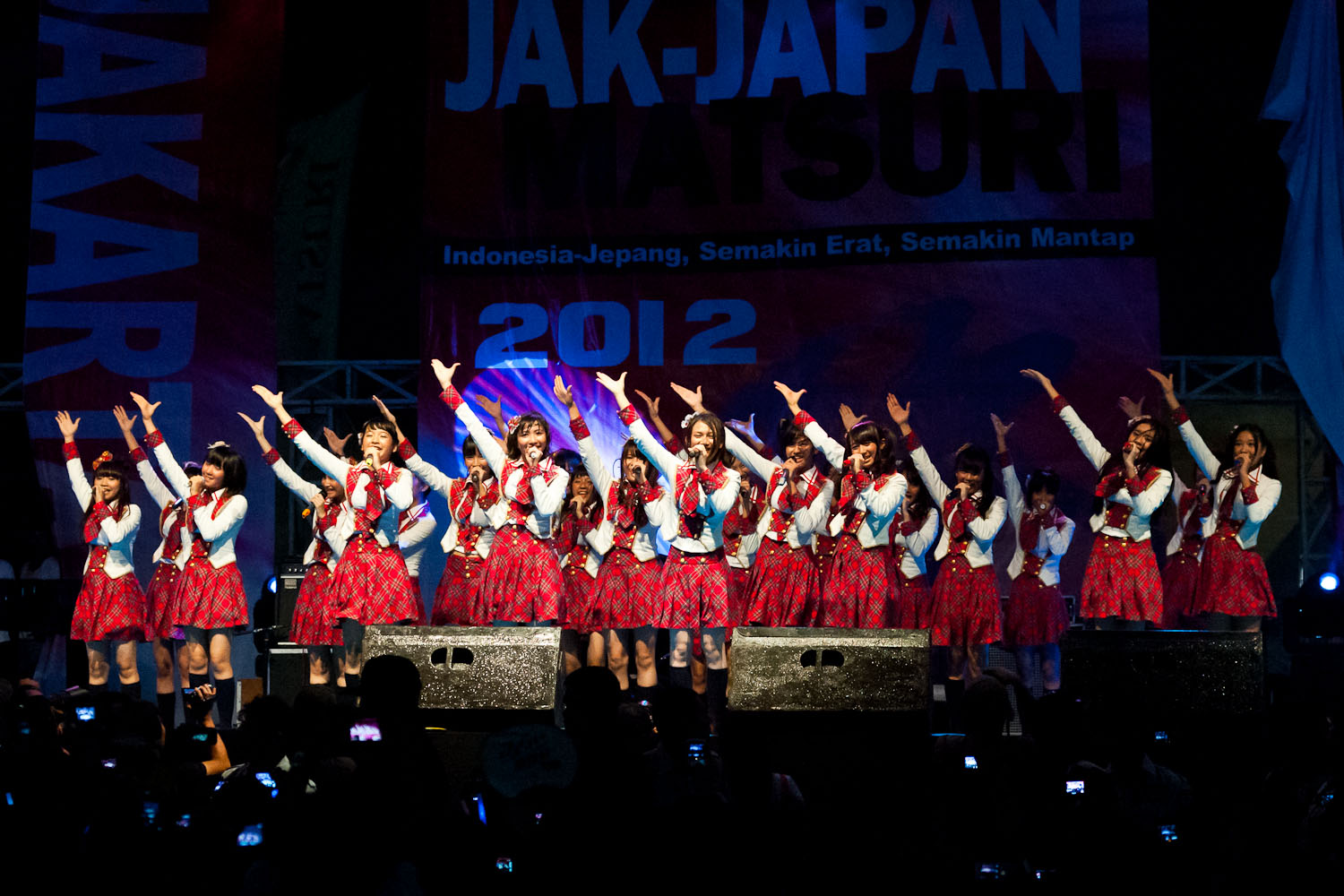
JKT48 performs at Jakarta–Japan Matsuri 2012

Indonesian pop music today, known simply as I-pop or Indo pop ("pop Indonesia") sometimes influenced by trends and recordings from West music,. Although influences ranging from American pop, British pop, and also Asian J-pop are obvious, the Indonesian pop phenomenon is not completely derivative; it expresses the sentiments and styles of contemporary Indonesian life.

Koes Bersaudara later formed as Koes Plus is considered one of the pioneers of Indonesian pop and rock and roll music in the 1960s and 1970s. The American and British music influences were obvious in the music of Koes Bersaudara, The Beatles were known to be the main influences of this band. Several Indonesian musician were survived through decades and become Indonesian music legends, such as pop and ballad singers Iwan Fals and Chrisye, as well as pop and dangdut maestro Rhoma Irama. One of the most influential Indonesian singers in pop music scene, especially during early 2000, is Agnes Monica, who had later known as Agnez Mo.

In late 90s through 2000s, the popular pop/poprock bands include Slank, Dewa 19, Peterpan, Gigi, Sheila on 7, Jamrud, Padi, Ungu, Radja, Letto, D'Masiv and Nidji, all of which tour regularly in Indonesia, Singapore and Malaysia and was featured on MTV Asia.

Indonesian pop or Indo pop music emerged from the 1980s until the 90s', known as Pop kreatif, are commonly referred to as "Indonesian city pop", due to their perceived similarities to the Japanese genre. The Japanese city pop and Pop Kreatif genre themselves gained popularity among youngsters and amateur musicians in the late 2010s via the Internet.

The most recent foreign influences on Indonesian pop music are influenced from J-pop and K-pop. Several bands such as J-Rocks emulate Japanese pop culture. Girl groups are also spreading among boy bands, such as 7icons and Cherrybelle, as well as JKT48 which is an offshoot of the Japanese AKB48.

=== Rock ===
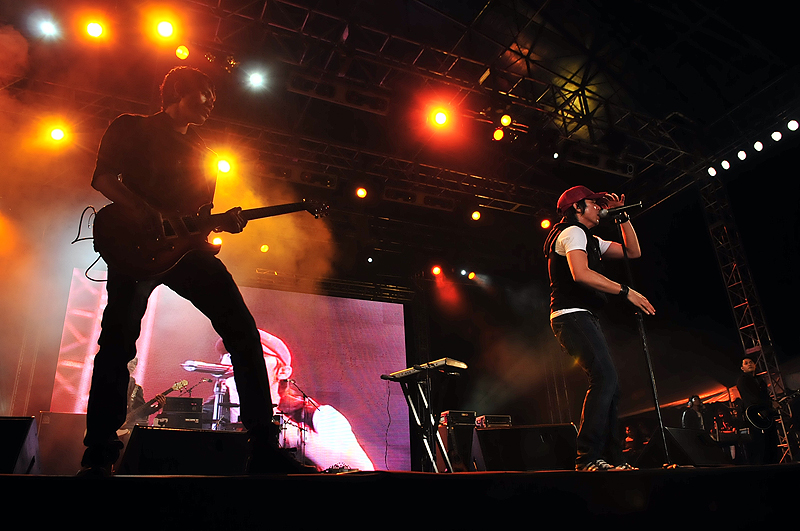
Peterpan performing in Kuala Lumpur, Malaysia, in 2008

Just like pop music, Indonesian rock scene also was heavily influenced by the development of rock music in America. The most influential Indonesian rock bands were probably Panbers, God Bless and D'Lloyd that was popular in the 1970s and 1980s. In the late 1980s to mid-1990s several female rock singers popularly known as "Lady Rockers" were famous in Indonesia, such as Nicky Astria, Poppy Mercury, Nike Ardilla, and Anggun who started her career in as a poprock singer in Indonesia before moving to France and pursue her international career. Other notable hard and poprock bands include Slank, Jamrud, Dewa 19, and Peterpan.

Some of Indonesian poprock bands are rekindled with their Malay roots and revived a genre called "Pop melayu" (Malay pop) and popular in the late 2000s. The pop Malay bands include Kangen Band, Wali, Hijau Daun, Armada, Angkasa , and ST 12.

Metal bands also exist, such as the metalcore band Killing Me Inside, Death Metal / Grindcore band Jasad and the Groove Metal / Metalcore band Burgerkill. Punk music scene also had steady underground success, with band like Pee Wee Gaskins, Superman Is Dead, and Netral rose to mainstream. Notable act from ska music is Tipe-X.

=== Dangdut ===
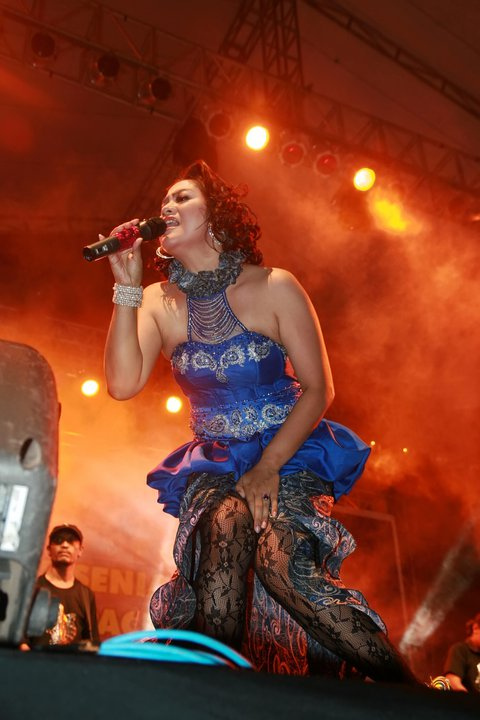
Dangdut performance

Dangdut is a popular semitraditional music genre of Indonesia which is partly derived of Indian, Arabic, and Malay music in the late 1960s in Jakarta city. It consists of melodious and harmonical music with the main tabla as the percussion beat especially in the classical dangdut versions. It was originally an Indonesian dance music that has spread throughout Southeast Asia, became the dominant pop style in the mid-1970s. Famous for its throbbing beat and the slightly moralistic lyrics that appeal to youth, dangdut stars dominate the modern pop scene. However dangdut—especially performed by female singers—also often featuring suggestive dance movements and naughty lyrics to appeal the larger audience. This development was strongly opposed by the conservative older generation dangdut artist.

Dangdut is based around the singers, and stars include Rhoma Irama and Elvy Sukaesih (the King and Queen of Dangdut), Mansyur S., A. Rafiq, Camelia Malik and Fahmy Shahab; along with Cici Paramida, Evie Tamala, Inul Daratista, Julia Perez and Dewi Perssik from younger generation.

=== Campursari ===
A musical fusion style of traditional Javanese music and dangdut that prevalent in Javanese cultural sphere, mainly Central Java, Yogyakarta and East Java, Perhaps its greatest current artist is Didi Kempot. In the western part of Java, the Sundanese Dangdut or Campursari version of the Sundanese was born and developed from traditional Jaipong music with a distinctive drum beat.

=== Experimental music ===
A significant experimental music scene has developed in Indonesia, with many acts combining traditional Indonesian vocal techniques and instrumentation with metal and electronic genres such as gabber and ambient. The experimental band Senyawa has achieved international success with these fusions. Labels such as Yes No Wave in Yogyakarta have been at the forefront of promoting the Indonesian experimental scene.

=== Gospel ===
Gospel music also has a big influence in Indonesia. Gospel music began to enter Indonesia in the 1980s when it was brought in by American Evangelical figures. Gospel music itself experienced its peak of popularity in Indonesia in the 1990s, at which time Franky Sihombing created many Christian spiritual songs. The entry of gospel music into Indonesia was not much sought after by music lovers in Indonesia, but it brought many changes to church music. Currently, many churches in Indonesia use gospel music as a means of their worship. Apart from that, there are also many famous Indonesian gospel musicians who release songs for Indonesian congregations as a means of evangelism and discipleship. Apart from that, there are also many well-known Indonesian gospel musicians such as Joy Tobing, Sidney Mohede, Sari Simorangkir and Franky Sihombing as well as church praise and worship team musicians such as JPCC Worship. Gospel music in Indonesia has now expanded into a whole genre of Christian spiritual music.

In recent years, gospel music has also become increasingly popular among Indonesian people, especially Christians. Gospel music concerts held in Indonesia are always packed with gospel music fans from various circles, especially Christian revival meetings. Apart from that, Indonesian gospel music is also popular in churches in neighboring countries, such as Malaysia, which is common because Malaysian is used in that country as an official language and as a language of instruction for worship, which has similar languages such as Indonesian so it is closely related and in part mutually understandable.

=== Jazz fusion ===
Some Indonesian musicians and bands have explored jazz music. Notable Indonesian jazz musicians include Jack Lesmana, Benny Likumahuwa, Benny Mustafa, Maryono, Bubi Chen Maliq & D'Essentials. Various other groups fuse contemporary westernised jazz fusion music with the traditional ethnic music traditions of their hometown. In the case of Krakatau and SambaSunda, bands from West Java, the traditional Sundanese kacapi suling and gamelan orchestra is performed alongside drums, keyboard and guitars. The Jakarta International Java Jazz Festival is representative of the latest development of Jazz in Indonesia, with many Jazz Festivals being held every year.

=== Reggae ===
Since the 1970s, reggae has been one of the most influential styles of music in Indonesia, including the phenomena of its fusion with dangdut, regional pop and other popular genres. This involves bands such as Steven & Coconut Treez, Shaggydog, and Souljah, and singers Mbah Surip, Amtenar, Dhyo Haw, Imanez, Nonk'Q Nongkray, and Tony Q Rastafara.

=== R&B ===
Contemporary R&B is a prominent music genre in Indonesia, produced by both established and emerging artists. Their varied musical styles have contributed to the genre's popularity and broader audience adoption across the country.

=== Hip hop ===
In Indonesia, hip-hop music was generally first introduced by Benyamin Sueb and Farid Hardja. Then, other hip-hop musicians also introduced hip-hop music to the public, such as Iwa-K and other hip-hop musicians.

In the 80s, when young people still loved rock music, Iwa-K started to get involved with rap music, a music genre that places more emphasis on chattering techniques than using musical instruments.

=== Funkot ===
Funkot is an electronic dance music genre of Indonesian origin that emerged in the 1990s.

=== Indie scene ===
By the end of the 2000s, indie bands such as Mocca, Float, White Shoes & the Couples Company, and Efek Rumah Kaca emerged into the mainstream, providing soundtracks for films, and subsequently toured in overseas territories. Entering the 2010s, indie music further broke into mainstream culture with its appeal amongst adolescents, due to its minimalist, melancholic sounds and age-appropriate lyrics. This commercial breakthrough for the genre was led by Payung Teduh, Fourtwenty, Stars and Rabbit, Sore, Danilla, Reality Club, Banda Neira, Barasuara, and Fiersa Besari.

=== Notable contemporary artists ===
- Agnez Mo
- Benyamin Sueb
- Bing Slamet
- Brian Immanuel (Rich Brian)
- Chrisye
- Ebiet G. Ade
- Fariz RM
- Gesang
- Gombloh
- Guruh Sukarnoputra
- Harry Roesli (1950s–1970s)
- Iwan Fals
- Nicole Zefanya (Niki)
- Titi DJ
- Titiek Puspa
- The Tielman Brothers, Eurasians originally from Indonesia who gained popularity in Europe. Their style is called Indorock, after the colonial term used for Eurasians: Indo-European, shortened to Indo.
- Rainych
- Stephanie Poetri

== See also ==
- Anugerah Musik Indonesia
- List of Indonesian musicians and musical groups
- List of Indonesian composers
- List of Indonesian rock bands
- List of Indonesian pop musicians
- List of Indonesian folk songs
- Minangkabau music
- Music of Bali
- Music of Java
- Music of Sumatra
- Music of Sunda
- Indonesian popular music recordings
