= Debu =

Debu may refer to:

== People ==
- Debu Bhattacherjee (1934–1994), Bangladeshi painter and musician
- Debu Bose, Indian actor
- Debu Chaudhuri, Indian sitarist
- Debu Deodhar, Indian cinematographer
- Debu Majumdar (born 1976), Indian cricket player
- Debu Mitra (born 1948), Indian cricket player

== Places ==
- Debu (island)

== Other ==
- Debu (group)
