= Prambors FM =

Indonesian commercial radio network

Prambors
- Country: Indonesia
- Broadcast area: Jakarta, Bandung, Semarang, Solo, Yogyakarta, Surabaya, Medan, Makassar, Manado
- Headquarters: Prambors Radio Building Jakarta, Indonesia

Programming
- Language(s): Indonesian, English
- Format: Contemporary hit radio, Top 40 (CHR)

Ownership
- Owner: Malik Sjafei Saleh (1971–Present)

History
- Launch date: 18 March 1971 (age 55)
- Former names: 102,3 FMANIA

Coverage
- Affiliates: Memora Group

Links
- Website: www.prambors.live

Prambors FM (formerly known as Prambors Rasisonia and 102,3 FMANIA) is a commercial contemporary hit radio based in Jakarta, Indonesia. Launched on March 18, 1971 in Jakarta, the purpose of station was to play pop music with their target audience being teenagers and young adults. Prambors is known as a teen icon in Indonesia throughout the 80's and 90's. It is owned and operated by Masima Radio Network (formerly Masima Contents + Channels).

== History ==
The station was founded by Imran Amir, Mursid Rustam, Malik Sjafei, Bambang Wahyudi, and Tri Tunggal. During the late 1960s, Prambors is the nickname one of the gangs from Menteng, in downtown Jakarta. Prambors is an abbreviation of Prambanan, Mendut, Borobudur, dan sekitarnya (Prambanan, Mendut, Borobudur and the surroundings), the name of several streets in Menteng, Central Jakarta. Starting from being amateur station, Prambors changed its name commercially due to government laws, with the name PT Radio Prambors. The radio network was launched in 1970 and incorporated in 1971 as Prambors Rasisonia — Rasisonia itself stands for Radio Siaran Sosial Niaga (Social Commercial Broadcast Radio).

== Program ==
Prambors started the careers of singers like Chrisye because of their LCLR (Lomba Cipta Lagu Remaja) in 1977. In the 1980s, the Catatan Si Boy drama series was Jakarta's favorite radio program. Due to its success on the radio, CSB made the jump to the big screens, to further success. Besides on-air programs, Prambors has off-air programs such as Prambors Nite and Tenda Mangkal.

== Stations ==
Prambors broadcasts over nine stations in Indonesia:

| Callsign | Frequency | Location |
|---|---|---|
| PM2FGK | 102.2 MHz | Jakarta |
| PM3FXJ | 98.4 MHz | Bandung |
| PM4FUY | 102.0 MHz | Semarang |
| PM4___ | 99.2 MHz | Surakarta |
| PM5FTZ | 95.8 MHz | Yogyakarta |
| PM6FUE | 89.3 MHz | Surabaya |
| PM3FAO | 97.5 MHz | Medan |
| PM8FOI | 105.1 MHz | Makassar |

Selected programs are aired over Memora FM (103.6 MHz) in Manado.

== See also ==
- Indonesian popular music recordings
