= Kangen (disambiguation) =

Kangen (寛元) is a Japanese era name for the years spanning 1243 through 1247.

Kangen may also refer to:

- Kangen (music) (管弦), a Japanese term used for gagaku concert music performed with wind, string and percussion instruments
- Kangen Band, a Malay Pop music group
- Kangen water filters, a brand of water ionizer home appliance
