= List of Indonesian pop musicians =

This is a list of Indo pop musicians:

== Solo artists ==
- Acha Septriasa
- Afgan
- Anggun
- Agnes Monica
- Bunga Citra Lestari
- Cakra Khan
- Chrisye
- Cinta Laura
- Dwiki Dharmawan
- Fatin Shidqia
- Glenn Fredly
- Guruh Gipsy
- Indahkus
- Irwansyah
- Isyana Sarasvati
- Iwan Fals
- Kris Dayanti
- Lusy Rahmawaty
- Maudy Ayunda
- Melly Goeslaw
- Niki
- Once
- Rainych
- Rich Brian
- Rossa
- Ruth Sahanaya
- Sandhy Sondoro
- Sherina Munaf
- Titi DJ
- Tulus
- Vidi Aldiano
- Vina Panduwinata

== Bands ==
- Bimbo
- Cokelat
- Caffeine
- D'Cinnamons
- D'Masiv
- Dewa 19
- Efek Rumah Kaca
- Four Seasons (Indonesian band)
- Gigi
- God Bless
- Gamma 1
- Gugun Blues Shelter
- Jamrud
- Jikustik
- J-Rocks
- Kahitna
- Kerispatih
- Killing Me Inside
- Koes Plus
- Koil
- Kotak
- Letto
- Maliq & D'Essentials
- Mocca
- Naif
- Netral
- Nidji
- Padi
- Panbers
- Pee Wee Gaskins
- Peterpan/Noah
- Radja
- Samsons
- Sheila on 7
- Slank
- Superman Is Dead
- ST 12
- The Changcuters
- Tipe-X
- Ungu
- Wali
- White Shoes & The Couples Company
- Yovie & Nuno

=== Male groups ===
- UN1TY
- SM*SH (Smash)
- Coboy Junior (2012–2014) (Now: CJR)
- Super7
- Four Seasons

=== Female groups ===
- AB Three (Be3)
- JKT48 (Jakarta Forty Eight)
- 7icons(Seven Icons)
- Cherry Belle
- S.O.S

== See also ==
- List of Indonesians
- List of Indonesian musicians and musical groups
- Lists of musicians
