= Indonesian popular music recordings =

Music

Recorded music is a reflection of modern Indonesian history and culture—specifically class consciousness, economics and post-colonial identity. Since the early 1970s, the production, marketing and distribution of recorded media, particularly popular music cassettes and VCDs, in Indonesia have evolved in tandem with the archipelago's ongoing integration of tradition and modernity.

== History ==
The roots of Indonesia's history of recorded music practices can be traced to the emergence of nationalism in the early 20th century and the eventual independence of Indonesia from the Dutch in the 1940s. The struggle for a national identity rooted in a synthesis of Eastern and Western perspectives extended into the realm of music, with nationalists suggesting that Indonesia's national music be a form of indigenized Western music, such as kroncong. This sentiment led to the establishment of state-sponsored conservatories and academies of music in both Java and Bali during the 1950s and 1960s, with similar schools established in Sumatra and Sulawesi during the 1970s. In this roughly twenty-year period, the Indonesian government also institutionalized the recording of both traditional and popular music throughout the archipelago with its support of P.N. Lokananta, the national recording company of Indonesia, a branch of the government's Department of Information since the late 1950s. "Although scholars have detected a gradual narrowing in the geographic and genre purview of Lokananta's recording and marketing strategies, considering this to be at odds with its status and purpose as a national recording company, the introduction of audiocassette recording technology in the 1960s gave rise to a robust industry of recorded music. In the 1970s, oil wealth and the relatively unrestricted import of cheap tape and recorders led to an extraordinary boom of the Indonesian cassette industry.

Central to the ongoing evolution of Indonesian popular music styles was an inherent tension between dueling aesthetics: gedongan ("refined", "international") and kampungan ("vulgar," "low class," "backward"). During the 1970s, the most prominent supporter of the gedongan style was Guruh Sukarno (born 1953), son of the first president of Indonesia and a musician since his early teens. Long a student of classical Javanese and Sundanese music while at the same time familiar with Western jazz and classics, Guruh set out in 1974 to elevate existing Indonesian-Western pop music and create a kind of neoclassic, syncretic style that would be at once Indonesian and international. Contrasting in many ways with Rhoma Irama and the many other dangdut singers popular during the 1970s, Guruh Sukarno was a member of the elite class and saw Indonesia's culture as pluralistic and inescapably mixed with influences from the West. Nevertheless, the 1970s also witnessed a gap between the rich and poor classes. Awareness of this gap, and sensitivity to the condition of the lower classes were central to the popularity of dangdut and the many genres it influenced.

Between the 1970s and 1990s, recorded Indonesian popular music grew to include, like most popular music elsewhere in the world, the use of at least some Western instruments and Western harmony. It was increasingly disseminated through the mass media, performed by recognized stars, and became essentially a "commercial" genre. In the process of reformation (Reformasi) that was put into motion with the resignation of president Suharto and the fall of his New Order regime in 1998, popular music became a common vehicle of protest, and many songs, cassettes and genres were labeled with the adjective reformasi..

== Popular Music Recordings in Indonesia Today ==
=== Overview ===
Nearly all of the music sold in Indonesia today is in the form of pre-recorded cassettes, but music is also available on compact disc, video compact disc (VCD). and laser disc (LD). The latter two formats contain images as well as sounds, and are mainly used to accompany karaoke performance. While the traditional, court-derived styles of gamelan and wayang kulit have been frequently recorded, sales of popular music in Indonesia have increased dramatically with the emergence of the cassette tape. Centered in Jakarta, Indonesia's music industry defines popular music as either "national" or "regional." National genres, including Pop sunda, kroncong, dangdut, qasidah modern, rock, rap, country, jazz, disco, house and Hawaiian, generally feature lyrics in Indonesian (though sometimes in English) and are marketed mainly in the urban regions throughout the archipelago, both as audio cassettes and compact discs. Sales trends, both regionally and nationally, are shifting towards popular music, which, in contrast to the field recordings of regional styles, is almost entirely a product of recording studios. In financial terms, the present day music industry in Indonesia is small by world standards, but it is the largest in Southeast Asia. Although cassette tapes are still sold in large quantities, since 1997 these have been replaced more and more by VCDs. Audio CDs have never been big sellers, as their price is relatively high.

Table 1: Average prices of popular music in different recorded formats, 2001–2002
| Legal cassette tape of popular music | Rp.10,000 – 15,000 |
| Legal VCD | Rp.16,000 – 40,000 |
| Legal audio-CD | Rp.30,000 – 50,000 |
| Bootlegged Indonesian/Malaysian VCDs | Rp.6,000 – 10,000 |

=== Cassettes ===
Indonesia is said to have the largest cassette industry in the world. Given the country's cultural and ethnic diversity, the recording industry, and the cassette industry in particular, has displayed great complexity in its structure and in how it serves the many ethnically distinct regions of the country. While the CD and the advent of digital technology has affected the production, dissemination and consumption of Indonesian popular music, cassette tapes remain the preferred source of recorded popular music for most Indonesians. The continued viability of the cassette medium in Indonesia springs from the fact that an audio cassette and the technology required to play it—-a simple cassette player/recorder—-are within the financial means of most Indonesians, including the peasant class. As cassettes and cassette players have penetrated the remotest villages in Indonesia, they have also become part of the vernacular. For example, in addition to the older word ngrekam ("to record"), contemporary Javanese now includes words for the process of recording onto a commercial cassette: "Gendhing kuwi wis dikasetkz" ("That piece has already been recorded on commercial cassette."). Much of what is available can be classified as "popular" music," including pop Berat (Western pop) and pop Indonesia (Indonesian pop). Also in abundance is pop Daerah, or regional pop, which is found all across Indonesia. Virtually all genres of pop Daerah are dependent on the cassette medium for their audience. Some Pop Daerah genres are little more than cassette-company experiments, generating only a few performers and a handful of tapes, but others are firmly established, with many performers and steady production. Four genres—-Pop Batak, Pop Minang, Pop Sunda, and Pop Jawa—-are especially solid. In the case of these four, some of the production comes out of Jakarta, relying upon Jakarta-based musicians and Jakarta facilities for recording, printing and distribution. However, most of the other regional genres are produced in their home regions (or in the nearby big cities). As a result, the cassette industry is national, regional, and local in character. The broad marketing of cassettes has not led to a musical homogenization or a weakening of regional styles. Rather, local cassette industries have promoted regional styles because, rather than being large national corporations, they are regional "backyard" enterprises that record, dub, and market local music primarily for local consumption. Commercial cassettes have also shaped the reputations of popular music performers, significantly raising the prestige and earning power of some recording artists while lowering them for others. Scholars have noted a trend towards the equalization of status for genres and marginal traditions through the distribution of cassettes; the cassette industry is said to act as a leveler, blurring the older status distinctions that were still in place a generation ago.

=== Video Compact Discs (VCDs) ===
Despite their ubiquity, the popularity of audio cassettes has been compromised somewhat by competition from the rapidly growing video compact disc (VCD) medium. Since the resignation of Suharto in 1998, VCDs, which are cheaper than audio CDs, have gradually been taking over the role of audio cassettes, and as of 2002 the VCD medium was considered more important than the World Wide Web to Indonesian consumers. Particularly notable about the VCD is its ability to combine sound and image through the digital medium. Like other emerging technologies, VCD players have proven to be outlets, especially for Indonesian youth, for expressing a desire for modernity and cosmopolitanism at the same time. Featuring modern, Western-style music videos that appear on MTV or VH1, professionally produced VCDs also claim their contents to be karaoke music, in which one can turn off the audio-channel with the sound of the vocalist, and just hear the accompaniment and see the images and text. As a source of participatory music making for the consumer, then, the VCD provides an opportunity for Indonesian consumers to interact directly with the body of popular music produced nationally.

On VCDs of pop Indonesia-—national, Western-style music with lyrics sung in Indonesian—the images are mainly urban: street life, cars, houses and other possessions are often featured prominently. Because VCDs are profitable, erotic images are important on almost all of them, as are lyrics about love and romance. Images on pop Daerah (regional pop) music VCDs seem to be more restrained than on the national ones. Also, on the regional pop music VCDs the erotic images tend to be produced mainly by actors other than the singers (who "just sing"), whereas on the pop Indonesia VCDs, the singers tend to be more actively involved in producing them. Despite their present association with underground works, all VCDs have to pass the censor before being released, which is how the government controls both image and text. Beyond its social implications, the popular music industry in Indonesia makes use of a new type of oral tradition made possible by the VCD. By displaying song texts on screen and mentioning the songs' composers, legal VCDs serve as audiovisual "texts" for both national and regional pop music in Indonesia.

=== Retail outlets ===
Historically in Indonesia popular music has been sold to consumers through small retail outlets whose merchandise mainly consists of cassettes and VCDs. Although music-related e-commerce is a small sector in the country and mainly focuses on selling to customers outside Indonesia, it is more likely to contribute to the internationalization of what used to be national or regional Indonesian popular music. Unlike retailers, e-commerce does not shape or reflect the consumption of Indonesian music by Indonesians. Like many institutions in Indonesia, popular music retail outlets are stratified by social class and generally calculate their sales activities based on the needs and interests of their intended audience.

==== Cassette stalls ====
Cassette stalls (warung kaset) typically are found in open-air markets in the poorer kampong (neighborhoods) of large Indonesian cities. They generally offer very few Western cassettes for sale (and no compact discs of any sort), but feature a wide variety of dangdut cassettes. Warung kaset distinguish themselves sonically from the other stalls in a traditional market by the loud recorded music they broadcast to passersby. The type of music played depends on the sales clerk, though sentimental pop ballads, often in English, are a frequent choice.

Cassette stalls offers customers a "try before you buy" policy. This allows a customer the option of trying out a recording on the stall's sound system before purchase, to test it for defects and to determine if he or she likes the music. This policy has had a democratizing effect on the sale of cassettes and indirectly exposes consumers to various local, regional and national styles.

==== Mall stores ====
Like malls in the United States or Europe, nearly all Indonesian malls feature at least one store selling recorded music. While all record shops in Indonesia sell some Indonesian recordings, music boutiques in upscale malls tend to carry mostly Western music. Mall music stores market themselves as portals to the global music culture. In fact, a recent study of product placement in mall-based record stores found that as little as 10 percent of available shelf space in a typical store is devoted to Indonesian music of any genre. Catering to customers from higher socioeconomic levels than those found among wareng kaset clientele, mall stores reflect the gedongan aspirations of middle- and upper-class consumers who see in music buying—-and, in particular, the purchase of CDs—an opportunity to participate in the economy of popular culture across national boundaries.

==== Mobile cassette vendors ====
Mobile cassette vendors make their way through city streets pushing wooden carts outfitted with car stereo systems. The cassettes offered for sale, normally legitimate (not infringed) copies, are intended to appeal to the servants and warung proprietors of a neighborhood, not its more affluent residents. The selection of recordings is typically dominated by dangdut and regional pop music. Since Western music is normally not offered in large quantities by mobile cassette vendors, these merchants are said to circumvent Jakarta's prestige hierarchies by specifically targeting rural migrants as opposed to city people.

Table 2: Recorded Music Sales Data for Indonesia (units sold), 1996-1999*
| Type | 1996 | 1997 | 1998 | 1999 (Oct.) |
| Indonesian Cassettes | 65,396,589 | 49,794,676 | 27,635,739 | 30,100,077 |
| Foreign Cassettes | 11,374,089 | 14,005,340 | 9,637,200 | 11,395,590 |
| Indonesian CDs | 265,475 | 778,370 | 315,910 | 532,900 |
| Karaoke VCDs | 19,500 | 701,870 | 1,335,390 | 4,196,590 |
| Karaoke Laser Disc (LD) | 21,375 | 21,975 | 2,205 | 1,050 |
| Total | 77,552,008 | 67,356,071 | 41,658,674 | 48,312,497 |

- Legal units only. Adapted from K.S. Theodore, "Industri Music Indonesia di Ujung Abad Ke 20," Buletin ASIRI 5 (1999): 10–11.

== Additional factors ==
=== Technology ===
Driving the development of Indonesia's popular music recording industry is the ongoing adoption and use of sound technologies, particularly from the industrialized nations of the West. Electronic sound technology in Indonesia is relatively new, and it is largely imported. Though much in evidence throughout Indonesia, it is in some ways treated as something foreign, strange, and "outside the system." While Internet technologies have come somewhat late to Indonesia, enterprising technophiles have devised ways to create and distribute Indonesian popular music in digital form. Some years ago, many popular Indonesian tunes were distributed through the Internet in MIDI format, which allowed only instrumental versions of the songs to be transmitted. Another way that the problem of a lack of bandwidth and other technical facilities in Indonesia has been addressed is entirely illegal and more local in approach. This is the distribution of so-called "CDs in mp3 format." Since 1997, these "data CDs" are sold in the larger shopping malls in Jakarta and other big cities. Fifteen or more popular music albums may be copied on these unlicensed CDs, which can be played on a PC with the proper software. The price of these unauthorized CDs is very low: Rp.10,000 – 15,000. (The price of legal versions of those fifteen albums (cassette tapes and audio CDs) would be about Rp.300,000.) Through the medium of the World Wide Web and as a free alternative to a music store purchase, Indonesian popular music has circulated both within and outside of the nation's borders.

A second area of the popular music industry that has adapted significantly to the advent of digital technologies is the network of recording studios in the archipelago. Based mostly (but not exclusively) in urban centers, Indonesia's recording studios have increasingly diversified out of the template established by the country's two largest recording companies, P.N. Lokananta (the national recording company of Indonesia) and Hidup Baru. In contrast to the 1950s and 1960s, many studios today are no longer owned solely by producers. Increasingly, artists themselves decide to build home-based studios furnished with up-to-date digital equipment, usually imported from Singapore. In particular, the rise of underground music (also called alternative music, or musik alternatif) has given individuals armed with music production skills and the appropriate tools a forum through which their recordings may be disseminated. The preferred method of producing and distributing Indonesian underground music is defiantly localist, operating outside the channels of the commercial music industry. For example, "underground" cassettes are, as a rule, not found in mall stores, cassette stalls, or any other conventional retail outlet. It is, in fact, illegal to sell them, as the Indonesian government does not collect any tax on the transaction. As a result, music producers and the musicians they work with have since 2000 begun to open underground boutiques (toko underground) in Jakarta, Bandung, Surabaya, Denpasar and other locales. These establishments are often owned and operated by veteran underground scene members and sometimes include rehearsal and recording studios as well. Through an integration of the production and retail functions of popular music making, technology innovations in Indonesia increasingly occur in localized, underground settings, as they often have in other parts of the world. At the same time, new technologies have not overpowered popular music recording in Indonesia nor "Westernized" the musical life of the country. Rather, they have provided new possibilities for a range of recording and production approaches.

=== Copyright infringement ===
Bootlegging audiocassettes and VCDs is a thriving business in all large cities of Indonesia. For example, in the Glodok business area in northern Jakarta known as the city's "Chinatown," an estimated one million illegal copies of recordings are produced each day. Newspaper reports suggest that, in order to keep their financial losses under control, some recording companies produce illegal copies themselves, right after launching their legal, registered and censored albums. With most legitimate Indonesian cassettes costing over Rp.12,000 each, vendors of illegally copied versions priced at Rp.6,000 or less can attract many buyers. The quality of these illicit versions varies, but they are often not noticeably inferior to the originals. In addition to selling illegal copies of complete albums, unlicensed cassette vendors sell unauthorized compilations of current hit songs. These compilations usually contain either dangdut or pop songs, and they often combine songs released by different record labels since they are not bound by copyright restrictions. Thus, infringing hits compilations are not only cheaper, but also more likely to contain all of the hit songs that are currently popular.

As efforts to curb illegal distribution and file sharing have intensified worldwide, the Indonesian popular music industry has been compelled to face the legal and financial ramifications of these activities. For example, a legal initiative concerning royalty payments for the kroncong song Bengawan Solo, composed by the Javanese songwriter Gesang Martohartono in 1949 and well-known and recorded in a number of Asian countries, became a matter of national controversy in 1989–1990 and created an awareness of cultural property and heritage that had not been there before. Nevertheless, infringement continues to shape the dynamic of the Indonesian popular music industry, particularly with respect to the illegal sale of "bootleg" audiocassettes recordings by American and European artists re-taped in Asia and sold at roughly a quarter of their original price. Although sales of these items had virtually ended by 1997, at the beginning of 2002 copyright violation had increased again to previously unknown levels. According to Arnel Affandi, the general manager of the Association of Recording Industries in Indonesia (ASIRI) for 2002–2005, it was estimated by the United States Trade Representative that in 1997 only 12% of the CDs and audio cassettes sold in the archipelago were illegal copies. In February 2002, 5 out of 6 of the audio cassettes, CDs and VCDs produced were illegal copies. The Office of the United States Trade Representative has placed Indonesia on the priority watch list for violating copyright laws, especially with respect to VCDs.

Table 3: Estimated figures of production numbers for the year 2001.
| Legal copies of Indonesian audiocassettes | 30- 35 million |
| Illegal copies of Indonesian audiocassettes | 200 million |
| Illegal copies of Indonesian VCDs (karaoke) | 120 million |
| Illegal copies of foreign audiocassettes | 50 million |

=== Class and status consciousness ===
Some foreigners believe that as a post-colonial society, modern Indonesia exhibits xenocentrism—the belief that a foreign, usually Western culture is superior to one's own—in its consumption of recorded music. According to the widespread xenocentric view of musical value in Indonesia, local musics, or "musics of the village," are considered kampungan, repellently backward and low-class, while even higher status Indonesian pop cannot match to the greatness of international pop, and is forever subject to the accusation of simply imitating Western originals. In the same way that the record-buying community in Indonesia tends to prefer the popular culture of other countries over its own, contemporary Indonesians consider the concept of gengsi (social status) to be purveyed through their musical tastes. Modern Indonesian music buyers adhere to the following hierarchy of gengsi as it relates to popular music:

1. Western popular music
2. pop Indonesia (Western-style pop music sung in Indonesian)
3. Dangdut
4. Pop Daerah (regional pop)
5. Indie rock

As this hierarchy demonstrates, Indonesian popular music, no matter how Westernized, is considered of lesser status than "international" Anglo-American music. It also shows that independent rock, produced and recorded outside the commercial mainstream, is granted very low status, regardless of its quality and the artistic or cultural value it may hold. Moreover, because Indonesia is a country in which class differences are obvious, frequently acknowledged, and pervasive in social life, music industry workers tend to view the Indonesian popular music market not as an entity composed of an undifferentiated mass of consumers, but as a ladder of different socioeconomic classes. The class-inflected hierarchy of musical genres is reflected in the range of retail prices for different types of cassette:

Table 4: Legitimate (Non-infringing) Indonesian Popular Music Cassette Prices by Genre, June 2000.
| Western pop | Rp.20,000 ($2.50) |
| Pop Indonesia | Rp.16,000 to Rp.18,000 ($2.00 to $2.25) |
| Dangdut | Rp.12,000 to Rp.14,000 ($1.50 to $1.75) |
| Regional pop (Pop Daerah) | Rp.10,000 to Rp.13,000 ($1.25 to $1.63) |
| Underground/Indie | Rp.10,000 to Rp.17,000 ($1.25 to $2.13) |

== See also ==
=== Indonesian popular music genres ===
- Dangdut
- Kroncong
- Jaipongan
- Qasidah modern
- Indonesian hip hop

=== Indonesian popular music stars ===
- Rhoma Irama
- Ebiet G. Ade
- Iwan Fals
- Chrisye
