= Pop melayu =

Malaysian pop rock music genre

- Stylistic origins: Pop rock; alternative rock; soft rock; Malaysian pop; Indo pop; Traditional folk music; Traditional pop
- Cultural origins: 1990s Indonesia and Malaysia
- Typical instruments: Vocals; guitar; bass guitar; keyboards; drums

Pop melayu (transl. Malay pop) is a pop rock music genre influenced by rhythms and musical traditions of the Malays of Indonesia, Malaysia, Singapore, and Brunei, plus their cultural sphere.

== History ==
The progenitor of this genre is the frequent movement of bangsawan acts between Malaya, Deli (now Medan), Riau Islands and Java which later developed into Orkes Melayu ("Malay orchestra") starting in the 1930s, their compositions took from Indian and Arabic influences played with Western instruments, while their song lyrics often took from pantun. Malayan-Singaporean cinema was often a huge inspiration, especially from P. Ramlee.

In 1960s Singapore, many 'fast guitar groups' (kumpulan gitar rancak, abbreviated as kugiran) sprung among the Malay community there influenced by contemporary Western music incorporating similar traditions.

Since the 2010s, There are two pop melayu streams including the classification which is popular in Malaysia and the other is in Indonesia. In Indonesia early, pop melayu was popular in the mid-2000s which was pioneered by ST12. Until now, there have been many popular music groups with this genre. Those that managed to penetrate the domestic and international markets included ST12, Wali, Kangen Band, Armada, Radja, Hijau Daun, Dadali, Repvblik, Demeises, and others.

The success of the pop melayu genre in dominating the market share in Indonesia, Malaysia and Brunei in general has also changed the color of the arrangements of pop genre music groups which were originally popular.

== See also ==
- Indo pop
- Malaysian popular music
- Music of Singapore
- Music of Brunei
