= The Jakarta Symphony =

The Jakarta Symphony began in the 1970s by musicians from the orchestra, Orkes Simponi Jakarta. The members were, the late Tony Suwandi, the late Embong Rahardjo, Suka Hardjana, Suwanto Suwandi, the late Sudomo, Nursyiwan Lesmana, the late F.X. Sutopo, Amir Katamsi and friends. Together with F. Kuswardianto, several other young talented musicians joined, such as Juhad Ansyari, Didiek SSS, Bambang Suardi, Erfy Larasati, Yunus, Gatot Soebiono, Noor Syamsi, Prima Muchlisin, Asmoro, Anna Prapti, Budi Soewarno, Irma Manurung, Juzan and Rahmat, Ni Gusti A.K. Kadensi, and Gatut Santoso.

== Concerts ==
A number of works presented by the Jakarta Symphony are:

- A Symphony of Hope, a charity program held in order to collect funds to build the Shekinah Charismatic Catholic Guiding and Education Center, in cooperation with the Shekinah Bina Insani Foundation. The first concert held on August 28, 2000 took place at the Grand Ballroom of Mulia Hotel, Jakarta. The Jakarta Symphony performed Mozart's Symphony No. 40 in G minor K. 550, Haydn's Concerto for Flute in D major, and several compositions by Pyotr Ilyich Tchaikovsky, Gioachino Rossini and Johann Strauss II. The late Indonesian flutist, Embong Rahadjo, presented one of his best performances there.
- In cooperation with Kua Etnika, the Jakarta Symphony performed an Opera at the Puncak Perayaan Sidang Agung KWI in 2002, at Gelora Bung Karno, Jakarta. Kua Etnika is a theatrical group led by Jaduk Ferianto, and Teater Koma, under the direction of N. Riantiarno. The Jakarta Symphony performed the Beethoven's Symphony No. 5 in front of H.E. Mr. Abdurrahman Wahid, President of Republic of Indonesia at that time, who gave a warm response to the show.
- The Jakarta Symphony delivered a concert in the form of a seminar, Musik untuk Meningkatkan Kecerdasan (Music to Increase Intelligence) in Gedung Yustinus, University of Atma Jaya, in 2002. During the seminar, the orchestra played Vivaldi's The Four Seasons together with the violinist Bagus Wiswakarma. The seminar was a form of cooperation with Atma Jaya Catholic University. The main purpose of the seminar was to increase public awareness of classical music as a means of increasing intelligence.
- Still in the form of a seminar entitled Musik Untuk Mengasah Hati (Music as a Means of Sharpening The Inner Self) held by Atma Jaya Catholic University in 2002, the Jakarta Symphony brought up works by Haydn and Mozart, including divertimenti and rondos.
- A charity concert was held in Gedung Kesenian Jakarta on May 23, 2003. A good cooperation was built on this concert with the parish Maria Kusuma Karmel. The orchestra presented Mozart's Missa Solemnis in C major K. 337 featuring the soprano Aning Katamsi, tenor Christopher Abimanyu, alto Luciana D. Oendon, and bass Rainier Revireino.
- Feel The Spirit Concert 2005, held on October 30, 2005at the Birawa Assembly Hall, Bidakara. The orchestra played compositions of John Rutter in Feel the Spirit, a few works of G.F. Handel, Andrew Lloyd Webber and Leonard Bernstein.
- Musica dall'Italia, October 20–21, with conductor Carlo Zappa. Presented: Overture dell’Opera L’Italiana in Algeri - Rossini, Sinfonia in Do Maggiore Jupiter - Mozart, Sejuta Bintang - Ismail Marzuki, Cintaku Jauh di Pulau - F.X. Sutopo, "Nessun Dorma" dell'opera Turandot - Puccini, Sinfonia in Sol Minore, Haffner - Mozart.
