= Panbers =

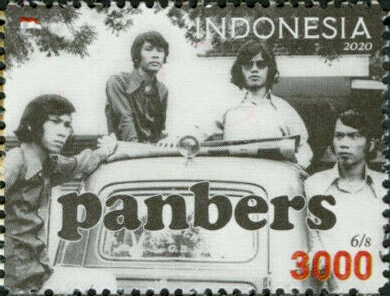
Panbers on a 2020 stamp of Indonesia

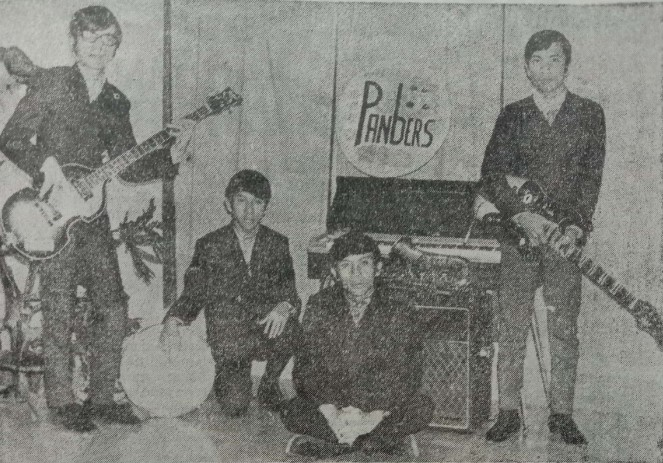
Photo published in 1969 in the indonesian magazine Aktuil

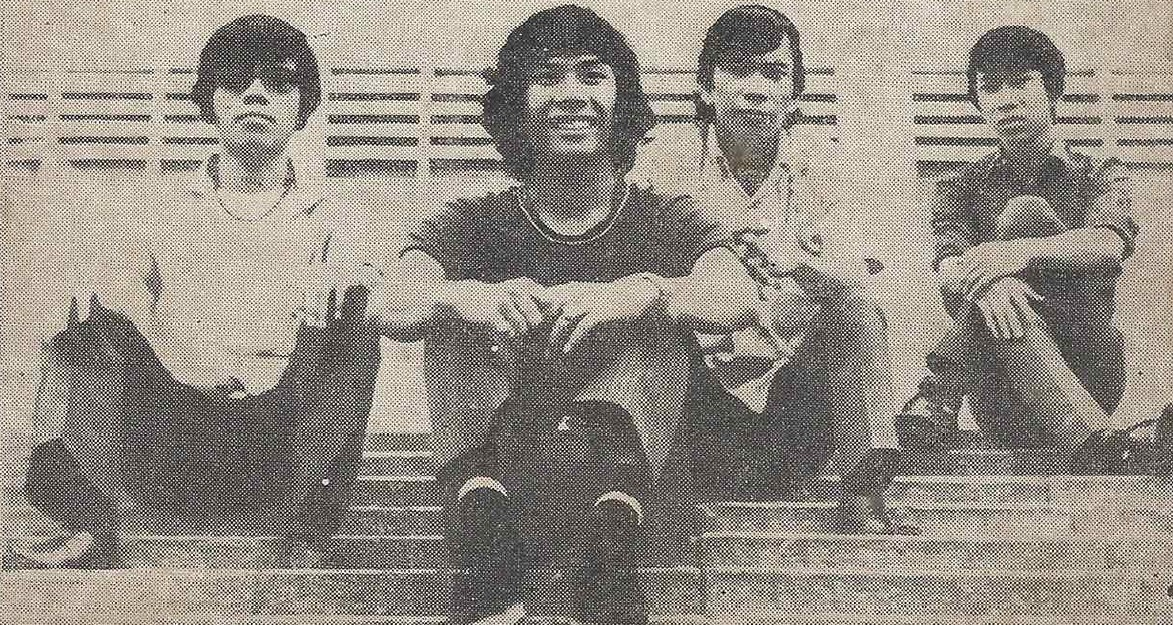
Photo published in 1970 in the same magazine

Panbers (short for Panjaitan Bersaudara / Panjaitan Brothers) is the name of a musical group. The band, founded in 1969, is composed of four brothers who are the sons of Drs. JMM Pandjaitan, S.H, (late) with BSO Sitompul. They are Hans Pandjaitan, Benny Pandjaitan, Doan Pandjaitan, and Asido Pandjaitan.

By naming their band Panbers, they pioneered their careers in the capital, ranging from filling entertainment events at the school party to a party of young people who was then known as the 'party Dayak'. With the unanimous determination of capital and their persistent struggle to create a song and bring it to parties, one song that they always bring wherever they performed is "Akhir Cinta". Starting from this, Panbers is becoming known and creating a new era in the world of Indonesian music.

Panbers career beginning with his first appearance on stage at the event Istora Bands Jamboree 1970 which makes Panbers more widely known. Especially after appearing on television opportunities already open to them. Original songs of their own work such as Bye Bye, Jakarta City Sound, "Akhir Cinta", "Hanya Semusim Bunga" and "Hanya Padamu" begin to be released. The success of their performances on television seems to attract the attention of Dick Tamimi, company managers Dimita Molding Industries, which later led Panbers into the recording studio. They were given the opportunity to record their songs in the form of LPs. As already known, their hits, entitled "Akhir Cinta" was released. This song always engraved in the hearts of music fans of Indonesia.

Panbers success in the world record is the beginning of the return of the band era in Indonesia, which at that time was still dominated by solo singers. Koeswoyo Brothers, often shortened to Koes Brothers, is a pioneering band of Rock'n Roll music in the '60s. The emergence of Panbers in early 1972 was followed by a number of bands who enliven the world of Indonesian music until now. Panbers lost one of their members, Hans Pandjaitan, being replaced by bassist Maxi Pandelaki. Meanwhile, Hans Pandjaitan replaced by a musician named Hans Noya.

Panbers has created more than 700 songs in dozens of albums, both the genre of pop, rock, spiritual, keroncong, even Malay. Until now, Panbers still exists to enliven the world of Indonesian music, not only active in live concerts, but also releasing albums. Some of their songs include "Gereja Tua", "Cinta dan Permata", "Kami Cinta Perdamaian", "Indonesia My Lovely Country", "Akhir Cinta", "Jakarta City Sound", "Haai", dan "Terlambat Sudah".

In October 2010, Panbers again lost one of its personnel forever. Doan Panjaitan died due to illness. However Panbers keep trying to make music with a distinguished timeless masterpieces.
