= Debu Mitra =

Indian cricketer

Personal information
- Born: 7 August 1948 (age 78); Kanpur, Uttar Pradesh, India
- Batting: Right-handed
- Bowling: Right-arm off break

Domestic team information
- Years: Team
- 1968/69–1973/74: Bengal

Career statistics
Competition	FC
Matches	14
Runs scored	530
Batting average	27.89
100s/50s	0/3
Top score	90
Balls bowled	27
Wickets	1
Bowling average	0.00
5 wickets in innings	0
10 wickets in match	0
Best bowling	1/0
Catches/stumpings	4/–
- Source: ESPNcricinfo, 30 November 2015

Debu Mitra (born 7 August 1948) is a former Indian first-class cricketer who played for Bengal cricket team from 1968/69 to 1973/74. He became a cricket coach in the 1990s and worked as the head coach of Saurashtra cricket team from 2004 to 2014.

== Career ==
Mitra played as a right-hand batsman and occasional right-arm off break bowler, representing Bengal cricket team. He appeared in 14 first-class matches between the 1968/69 and 1973/74 seasons.

After having coached Bengal as well as India under-19s, Mitra became the coach of Saurashtra cricket team in the 2004/05 season when the team was in the Plate division of the Ranji Trophy. Being regarded as minnows, Saurashtra became the Plate division champions in 2005/06 and were promoted to the Elite division of the Ranji Trophy. Saurashtra reached the Ranji semifinals for the first time in 2007/08 and also became the champions of the 2007–08 Vijay Hazare Trophy (Ranji One-day Trophy). Saurashtra reached the Ranji semifinals for a second consecutive time in the following season, and became runners-up of 2012–13 Ranji Trophy, under Mitra's mentorship.

Mitra is the childhood coach of Indian cricketers like Sourav Ganguly and Ravindra Jadeja.
