= Letto =

Indonesian pop rock band

- Origin: Yogyakarta, Indonesia
- Genres: Pop rock, Pop
- Years active: 2004-present
- Label: Musica Studios
- Members: Noe; Patub; Cornel; Arian; Dhedot; Widi
- Website: www.lettolink.com

Letto is a Pop rock band formed in Yogyakarta, Indonesia in 2004. The group comprises vocalist Noe, drummer Dhedot, bassist Arian and guitarist Patub.

Letto are known for their hit singles, such as "Sandaran Hati", "Ruang Rindu", "Sebelum Cahaya" and "Lubang di Hati". The first album titled Truth, Cry and Lie, released in 2005.

== Band members ==
=== Current members ===
- Sabrang Mowo Damar Panuluh – lead vocals, occasional keyboards (2004–present)
- Agus Riyono – lead guitar, backing vocals (2004–present)
- Ari Prastowo – bass, backing vocals (2004–present; on hiatus since 2022)
- Dedi Riyono – drums, percussion (2004–present)
- Cornel – rhythm guitar, backing vocals (2016–present; touring member 2005–2016)
- Widi Cipto Utomo – keyboards, piano, synthesizer, backing vocals (2016–present)

=== Touring members ===
- Darto – bass (2022–present)

== Discography ==
| Year | Album |
|---|---|
| 2005 | Truth, Cry, and Lie |
| 2007 | Don't Make Me Sad |
| 2009 | Lethologica |
| 2011 | Cinta... Bersabarlah |
| 2022 | Anthology |
