= Debu (group) =

DEBU
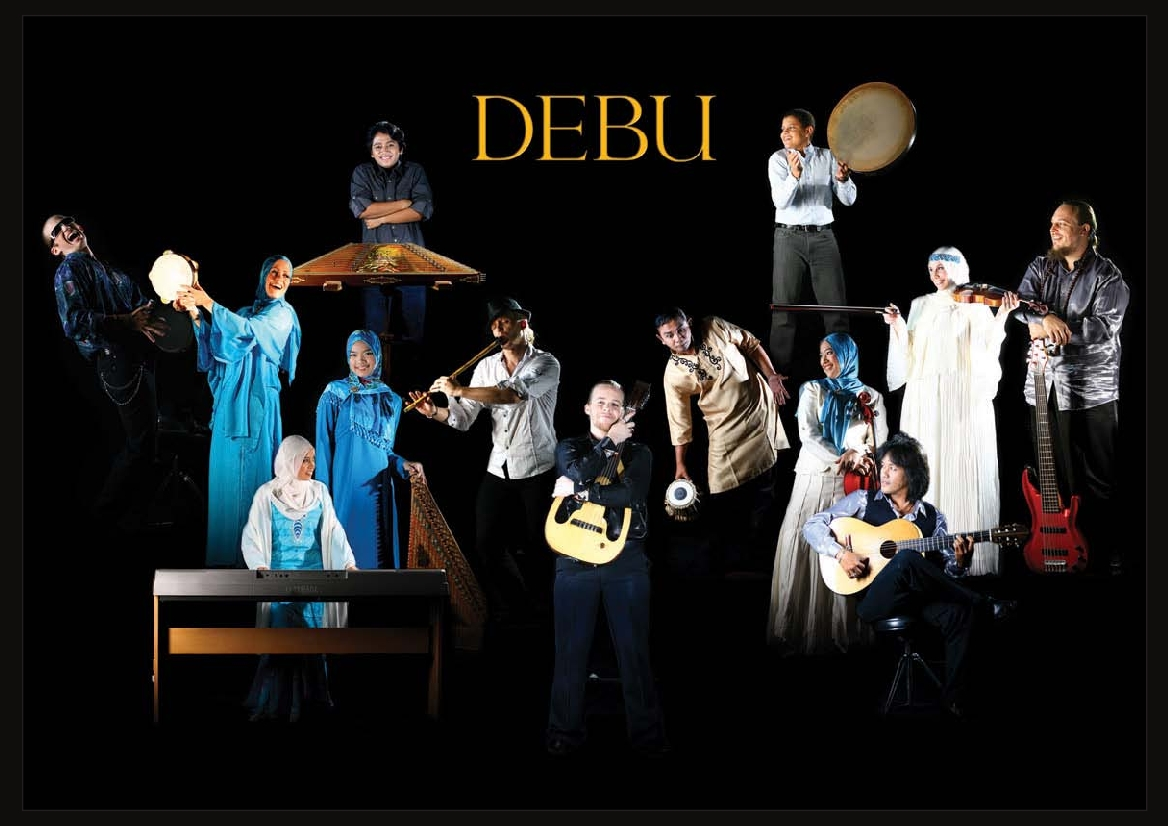

Background information
- Origin: United States; Indonesia
- Genres: Spiritual, world fusion, Nasyid, world
- Years active: 2001 - present
- Labels: Forte, Dust Productions, Fame Mobs
- Website: www.musikdebu.com

Debu is a group of Muslim musicians formed in 2001 and currently based in South Jakarta, Indonesia. Most of the band's members are American, with other members from Indonesia. Some of the original members were teachers at an Indonesian university in Makassar, where the band began informally as a kind of extracurricular activity.

Their band name is in the Indonesian language and means "dust", which is an indication for the listener to avoid focusing on band members because they are insignificant in comparison to the music and the message: "After having already come to know DEBU, we hope people will begin to understand what they are, who they are and why they do what they are doing. But after that, one needs to forget it all because DEBU isn't really anything, nor anybody, and there is simply no reason to ask about them. They have come from Him and are in the process of returning to Him. What should be remembered, however, is the message they bring."

Debu's music is a mix of sounds of Middle Eastern strings, thumping drums, flutes, violins, santur, flamenco guitar, baglama, tambura, oud, dumbek, electric bass and traditional Indonesian instruments like the Suling Sunda (Sundanese flute). Their music lyrics are about peace, the love and longing to the Creator. "Their long-awaited message of love and peace is not new; to them it's the essence of Islam, the Sufi way."

Their songs are in Indonesian, Arabic, English, Persian, Turkish, Spanish and Chinese language. They have released five Indonesian albums and one Turkish album. They are often featured on Indonesian TV.

== Discography ==
=== Albums ===
==== Indonesian albums ====
- Mabuk Cinta (Drunk with Love) - 2003
  - 1. Ampunilah Saya (Forgive Me)
  - 2. Cinta Saja (Just Love)
  - 3. Lautan Hatiku (The Sea of My Heart)
  - 4. Badan dan Hati (Body and Soul)
  - 5. Insyaa Allah (If Allah Wills)
  - 6. Didalam Taman Kekasih (In My Beloved's Garden)
  - 7. Asyik Nama Allah (Madly in Love with the Name of Allah)
  - 8. Dari Timur Terbit Cahaya (From the East Dawns the Light)
  - 9. Mustafa Ainul Waraa (Mustafa, the Essence of Mankind)
  - 10. Allah, Hati MemanggilMu (Allah, My Heart Calls Out to You)
- Makin Mabuk (Even More Drunk) - 2004
  - 1. Pesta Asyik (Joyous Celebration)
  - 2. Mazhab Cinta (The Path of Love)
  - 3. Biduan InstanaNya (Singer in His Palace)
  - 4. Astaghfirullah (Lord Forgive Me)
  - 5. Tawanan Kegembiraan (Prisoner of Joy)
  - 6. Salawat Buat Ahmad (Blessings on Ahmad)
  - 7. Don't Turn Back
  - 8. Mabuk Mabuk (Drunk, Drunk)
  - 9. Angin Sepoi2 (Gentle Breeze)
  - 10. Ucapkanlah Bersama (Say It Together)
  - 11. Satu Lagu Lagi (Sing One More Song)
  - 12. Gerbang Tol (Toll Gate)
  - 13. Ayolah Jiwa Yang Tenang (Come on, Tranquil Soul)
- Nyawa dan Cinta (The Soul and Love) - 2006
  - 1. Nyawa dan Cinta (The Soul and Love)
  - 2. Agama (Religion)
  - 3. Harta Dalam Puing (Treasure in the Ruins)
  - 4. Babun Nikmat (The Door of Delight)
  - 5. Kami Tak Keluar (We're not Leaving)
  - 6. Hentakkanlah Kaki (Stomp Your Feet)
  - 7. Tobat Berkali-kali (Repent Again and Again)
  - 8. Sallallahu
  - 9. Dendang Sufi (Sufi Song)
  - 10. Kemerdekaan (Freedom)
- Gubahan Pecinta (A Travel Guide) - 2007
  - 1. Lingkaran Zikir Kita (Our Circle of Remembrance)
  - 2. Sasakala Cinta (Love's Unspoken Tale)
  - 3. Doa Rakyat (Prayer of the People)
  - 4. Ampunilah Saya (Forgive Me)
  - 5. Doa Cinta (Prayer of Love)
  - 6. Palace Troubador
  - 7. Allah My Heart Calls Out to You
  - 8. Solamente Amor (Only Love)
  - 9. Sarayda (In the Palace)
  - 10. Yaa Laitani (Where's the Joy of Life)
  - 11. Jin Ni Ming Bai (Only You Understand)
  - 12. L’ Alba (The Dawn)
- Dianggap Gila (They Say You're Crazy) - 2010
  - 1. Bahtera Mustafa (Mustafa's Ship, a.s.)
  - 2. Salawat
  - 3. Malam Ini (Tonight)
  - 4. Macan Hutan (Tiger of the Forest)
  - 5. Dianggap Gila (They Say You're Crazy)
  - 6. Amanat (A Sacred Trust)
  - 7. Doa Rakyat (Every Man's Prayer)

==== Turkish album ====
- Hep Beraber (Let's Say It Together) - 2007
  - 1. Sallallahu (Blessings)
  - 2. Ancak Ask (Just Love)
  - 3. Ya Laitani (Where's the Joy of Life?)
  - 4. Ask Mezhebi (The Path of Love)
  - 5. Gonlum Seni Cagiriyor (My Heart Calls Out to You)
  - 6. Lailaheillallah (Translated:Allah is the only God; Let's Say It All Together)
  - 7. Palace Troubadour
  - 8. Sarayda (Palace Troubadour)
  - 9. Halk Duasi (Every Man's Prayer)
  - 10. Mustafa Gemisinde (Mustafa's Ship, a.s.).

==== Compilation album ====
- Palace Troubadour - 2007
  - 1. Sarayda (In the Palace) - Turkish
  - 2. My Heart Calls Out to You - English
  - 3. Borracho, Borracho (Drunk with Love) - Spanish
  - 4. Mehtapta (In the Moonlight) - Turkish
  - 5. Jin Ni Ming Bai (Only You Understand) - Chinese
  - 6. Mutribul-Qasr (Palace Troubadour) - Arabic
  - 7. Ayunan Asmara (The Swing of Love) - Indonesian
  - 8. Palace Troubadour - English
  - 9. Sallallahu (Blessings) - Turkish/Arabic
  - 10. Ya Laitani (Where's the Joy of Life?) - Arabic
  - 11. Nyawa dan Cinta (The Soul and Love) - Indonesian
  - 12. Dendang Sufi (A Sufi Tale) - Indonesian
  - 13. L'Alba (The Dawn) - Italian featuring Hayam Nur as Sufi
  - 14. Solamente Amor (Only Love) - Spanish
  - 15. The Prophet's Path - English

==== Upcoming albums ====
- Arabic Album - (projected release in 2011)

== Members ==
- Mustafa Daood
- Ali Mujahid
- Muhammad Saleem
- Daood Abdullah
- Dhimas Ramadhan
- Luthfi Rahimi
- Abdullah Ibn Daood
- Shakurah Yasirah
- Naseem Nahid DeVoe
- Ali Muhammad
- Ahmad Alkauthar
- Nadira Adriani

== Accident ==
On early Monday, 18 April 2022, a black Toyota Vellfire carrying 5 Debu band personnel and a driver had a hit-and-run accident with a truck that moved slowly. Two of their personnel: Firdaus, and Alhadad Amal Sheikh Aidaros from Malaysia, were killed. Another two personnel were heavily injured: Daood Abdullah Al Daood from Tegal, Central Java, who suffered broken leg in his right leg, and Umar from Cilandak, South Jakarta. The driver and the last personnel, Jamilah Binti Abdul Qadir, suffered light injuries.
