= Indonesian hip-hop =

Music genre

Indonesian hip-hop is hip-hop created in Indonesia.

== History and styles ==
Hip-hop music began to be produced in Indonesia in the early 1990s, with the first Indonesian artist to release a full-length hip-hop album being the emcee Iwa K. It became especially popular in the eastern provinces, such as of Papua and Maluku. As of 2023, the 50th anniversary of hip hop music since its birth in New York City, the genre is still going strong in Indonesia.

Many Indonesian hip-hop groups rhyme in the Indonesian language, but there are also groups that rhyme in English. Variously, songs often combine formal Indonesian with street slang, youth code, regionally colored pronunciations, and even expressions from regional languages (typically Javanese, Sundanese, or Betawi). Indonesian hip-hop is often mixed with heavy metal, dubbed "hip-metal". Groups such as Iwa-K and Denada produce music in this style.

One key feature of Indonesian hip-hop that is different compared with American hip-hop is that the language used in Indonesian hip-hop is more polite and does not use vulgar language, and does not often make references to sex and violence.

Indonesian hip-hop music is a youth subculture. It has been seen as a form of protest against the New Order government's state-imposed understanding of the Indonesian cultural identity. It has largely been condemned by key political figures such as former president B.J. Habibie. In January 1995, Habibie raised objections against organising an Indonesian rap festival. As reported in the weekly magazine Gatra, Habibie stated:

The younger generation shouldn't want to be enslaved by an aspect of foreign culture which isn't even liked in its own country. It's not even appropriate over there, much less in Indonesia. It's not suitable... I don't agree with it because it's of no use whatsoever, especially for the young generation.

Papuan hip-hop musicians often examine political issues such as Papuan independence.

== Indonesian hip-hop musicians ==
As of 2005 other Indonesian hip-hop groups and solos included Neo, Boyz Got No Brain, Sweet Martabak, Saykoji, ZeckoZICK, 8 Ball, Laze, JFlow, Ecko Show, Zero Nine, Behind Da Board, Borneo Clan, Jie Rapp, and female rapper Yacko.

Rich Brian gained internet popularity through his single, "Dat Stick" in 2016, with the song peaking at number 4 on the U.S. Bubbling Under R&B/Hip-Hop Singles chart.

The Jogja Hiphop Foundation (JHF), founded in 2003, infuses Indonesian culture into their music. They believe that traditional Javanese wayang kulit and gamelan music form solid bases for hip-hop to build on. JHF's musical inspiration comes from a variety of diverse indigenous sources such as gamelan, local folktales, shalawatan, dangdut, and Jathilan. In 2014, JHF also started a clothing brand, Bom Batik.

Papuan hip-hop artist Epo D'Fenomeno (real name Onesiasi Chelvox Urbinas aka "Epo"), a Papuan of the Biak tribe, is a rapper and producer who started making music in 2005 and began recording in 2007. Epo is a major influence in the Indonesian hip hop scene, having produced hundreds of singles, founded a music studio and record label, as well as managing six rappers. He also runs free classes for young people to learn how to sing and compose lyrics for rap music, and works with friend and co-producer Ortis Yarangga to produce his own music. His label is called Rum Fararur, which means "house for work" in the language of his father's home town, Kabupaten Biak Numfor. His home and studio are located on premises in the Abepura area of Jayapura City. In 2018, Epo, representing Papua province, won third place in the "Beef Rap Battle" in Jakarta (where he lived for three years), worth Rp 30 million. This was followed by a performance at the 17th anniversary celebration of a national media outlet. In 2021, he performed at the closing ceremony of the 20th National Sports Week in Jayapura, with musician Alffy Rev and singer Nowela Mikhelia.

As of 2023, other popular hip-hop musicians in the eastern provinces include:

- Freedom Jayapura dance squad
- Hollandia 98, formed in 2014
- Grizzly Cluivert Nahusuly, based in Ambon, Maluku, sings in the Ambonese language, and aims to sing gentler songs than most rappers.
- Bianca da Silva, a female rapper based in the city of Maumere in the province of Nusa Tenggara Timur

Others across the country active in 2022 include:

- Ramengvrl, since 2016
- KeilandBoi, since 2020
- Jerefundamental, since 2006
- Envy, a hip-hop collective in South Jakarta since 2018
- Tuan Tigabelas, lead singer in R.E.P. from 2013, solo since 2019
- A(riel) Nayaka, raps in English as well as Indonesian; his 2018 English-language album Cadence Blue was the first hip-hop album ever nominated for Album of the Year at the Indonesian Music Awards
- MukaRakat, a group since 2017, nominated at the 2021 Indonesian Music Awards
- Warren Hue, signed with New York label 88rising; included in Forbes' 2022 "30 Under 30" Asia list
- Yacko, since the 1990s, highlights women's issues in her work
- ZeckoZICK, since 2012.
- Tenxi, making music since 2021 but found recent success by making music that blends hip-hop and dangdut genre.
- PORIS, a hip-hop collective since 2024 that help introduced the rage, a subgenre of trap music, heavily influenced by the likes of Playboi Carti
- MrPipsterr & Christmas Taco, a producer-rapper duo from Makassar since 2023, heavily inspired by the old school era of hip-hop but their discography sometimes experiment a lot in different sub-genres of hip-hop.
