= Kangen Band =

Malay Pop music group

- Also known as: Cleopatra (2000–2004); Kangen Band (2005–present)
- Origin: Bandar Lampung, Indonesia
- Genres: Malay pop; Indo pop
- Years active: 2005–present
- Labels: Warner Music Indonesia (2006–2015); TA Pro (2016–2017); GP Records (2018–2020); Wahana Studio's (2021–present)
- Members: Andika Mahesa; Dodi Hardiyanto; Rustam Wijaya; Novri Azwar; Muhammad Bari Alfarizi
- Past members: Reyhan Githa Umara; Baim Kurniawan; Deden Hidayat; Rina Avia; Rezka Chaniago; Enddru Hitaro; Risa Ismal

Kangen Band is a Malay Pop music group from Indonesia which was formed on 4 July 2005 in Bandar Lampung by Dodhy Hardianto and his friends. The band often changes personnel. However, the band turns into full formation in 2020.

== History ==
In 2008, Kangen Band launched their third album, Bintang 14 Hari. Bintang 14 Hari presents a different color of music by featuring Malay elements and exploring Javanese elements. On this album, Kangen hooked arranger Andi Bayou with Eren's backing vocals.
