= Royal road progression =

Four-chord progression

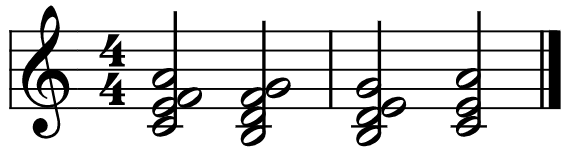
IV^{M7}–V^{7}–iii^{7}–vi chord progression in C.

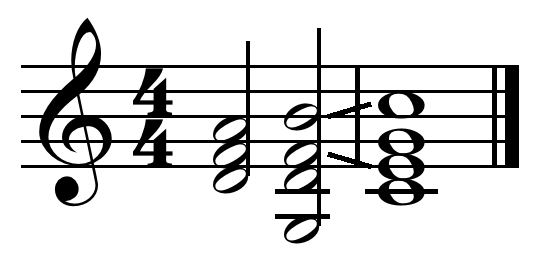
One potential way to resolve the chord progression using the tonic chord: ii–V^{7}–I.

The royal road progression (王道進行, ōdō shinkō), also known as the IV^{M7}–V^{7}–iii^{7}–vi progression or koakuma chord progression (小悪魔コード進行, koakuma kōdo shinkō), is a common chord progression within contemporary Japanese pop music.

== The chord progression ==
It involves the seventh chords of IV, V, and iii, along with a vi chord; for example, in the key of C major, this would be: F^{M7}–G^{7}–Em^{7}–Am. The progression is also very often found with a vi^{7} chord in place of the vi, thereby making every chord in the progression a seventh chord.

The chord progression may be resolved with the tonic chord, for example in a IV^{M7}–V^{7}–I or a ii^{7}–V^{7}–I progression. IV^{M7}–V^{7}–iii^{7}–vi–ii^{7}–V^{7}–I creates a full circle of fifths progression in the major mode, with V^{7} substituting for vii°. In C major, this would be F^{M7}–G^{7}–Em^{7}–Am–Dm^{7}–G^{7}–C.

The basic progression can be found in two versions. The first uses V^{7} in its third inversion (G^{7}/F), the other uses V^{7} in its root position (G^{7}). The former appears in lushly orchestrated pop arrangements, while the latter appears mainly in rock and electronic music.

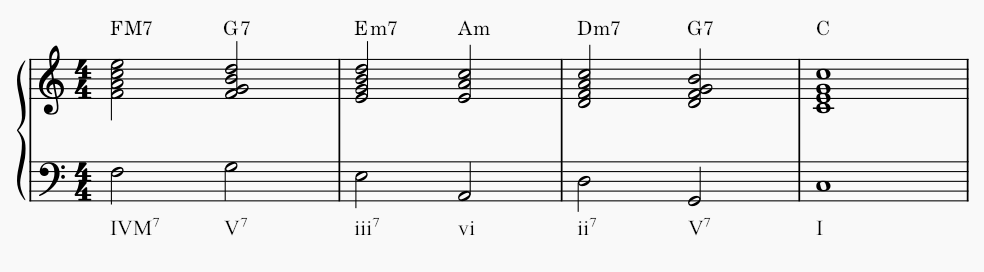
Ōdō progression in major with cadential resolution: IV^{M7}–V^{7}–iii^{7}–vi–ii^{7}–V^{7}–I.

In a minor key, there are two versions of the progression: VI^{M7}–VII^{7}–v^{7}–i and iv^{7}–v^{7}–III^{M7}–VI. The first version can be thought as an essential iv–v–v–i with the VI and VII chords substituting for the iv and v respectively, or as a VI–ii°–v–i with the ii° being substituted by the VII chord. For the second version, a cadential suffix may be added, such as iv^{7}–V^{7}–i or ii^{ø7}–V^{7}–i. When resolved by ii^{ø7}–V^{7}–i, a large progression iv^{7}–v^{7}–III^{M7}–VI–ii^{ø7}–V^{7}–i is created, where the v^{7} substitutes for the VII. In A minor, this would be Dm^{7}–Em^{7}–C^{M7}–F–Bm^{7(♭5)}–E^{7}–Am.

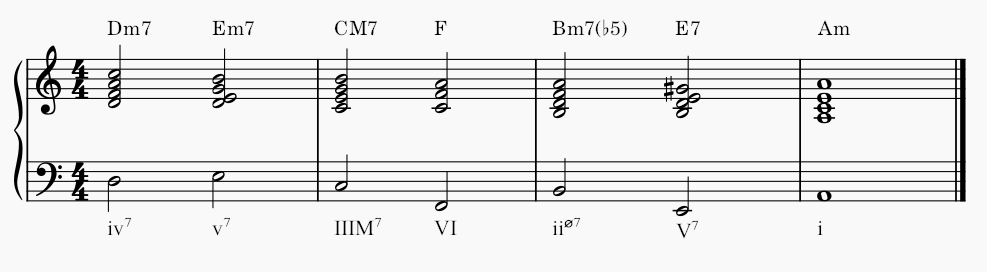
Ōdō progression in minor with cadential resolution: iv^{7}–v^{7}–III^{M7}–VI–ii^{ø7}–V^{7}–i.

Variations on the royal road progression may include IV^{M7}–V^{7}–I^{M7}–vi, ii^{7}–V^{7}–iii^{7}–vi, or IV^{M7}–vii^{ø7}–iii^{7}–vi for the major version, and iv^{7}–VII^{7}–v^{7}–i, ii^{ø7}–VII^{7}–v^{7}–i, VI^{M7}–ii^{ø7}–v^{7}–i, or iv^{7}–VII^{7}–III^{M7}–VI for the minor version.

When this progression is resolved by a ii^{7}–V^{7}–I cadence, it becomes IV^{M7}–V^{7}–iii^{7}–vi–ii^{7}–V^{7}–I, a sequence of descending fifths with V^{7} substituting for the vii° chord. The sequence of descending fifths was used regularly in tonal music since the Baroque era.

=== Variations ===
- IV^{M7}–V^{7}–iii^{7}–vi^{7} – basic form.
- IV–V–iii–vi – triad form.

Replacing first chord:

- ii^{7}–V^{7}–iii^{7}–vi^{7}

Replacing second chord:

- IV^{M7}–V^{7} ^{(third inversion)} –iii^{7}–vi^{7} – creates a smooth bass line.
- IV^{M7}–iv^{7}–iii^{7}–vi^{7}

Replacing third chord:

- IV^{M7}–V^{7}–III^{7}–vi^{7} – replace iii with secondary dominant V^{7}/vi, that is III^{7}.
- IV^{M7}–V^{7}–I–vi^{7} – interchange III with I, both serves tonic role.

Replacing fourth chord:

- IV^{M7}–V^{7}–III^{7}–VI^{7}

== Nomenclature ==
The name for the progression, ōdō shinkō (王道進行), literally translates to "royal road progression". In English, the expression "royal road" is used to describe an easy or painless method to do something.

An alternative term, koakuma chord progression, was originally coined by Japanese music producer Seiji Kameda on the 2014 NHK television show Kameda's Music Academy (亀田音楽専門学校, Kameda ongaku senmon gakkō). The phrase koakuma (小悪魔; lit. "little devil") is a phrase used to describe a seductive person who teases with one's feelings; as the chord progression involves two major chords in succession followed immediately by two minor chords, Kameda describes the moment where the progression moves from the major dominant chord to the minor mediant chord as akin to the moment of heartbreak induced by a playful lover, hence the name.

== History ==
The royal road progression was originally influenced by jazz and rock progressions originating in Western music. The earliest example of the progression in J-Pop occurs in Yumi Arai's "Yasashisa ni Tsutsumareta Nara" (1974), closely followed by Arai's "Sotsugyou Shashin" (1975), released as a hit single by Hi-Fi Set in 1975. The opening of the latter song is very similar to Edward Elgar's "Land of Hope and Glory", which contains a IV−V^{4/2}−I^{6}−vi (F–G^{7}–C/E–Am) progression. Lowering the C in the C/E chord to B would give Em (iii), thus producing a complete royal road progression. Even if the lineage of the progression cannot be traced back to Elgar, the basic IV–V–I–vi progression could be considered a predecessor to the royal road progression, and this IV–V–I–vi progression was used in the Beatles' "I Want to Hold Your Hand", a hit in Japan in the 1960s.

Arai's use of the progression led to other 1970s and 1980s Japanese city pop artists, such as Hiroshi Madoka and Akiko Yano, using it. However, the progression reached a new level of popularity after its use in Stock Aitken Waterman's Eurodisco-influenced pop tracks such as Rick Astley's "Never Gonna Give You Up" and Kylie Minogue's "I Should Be So Lucky" (1987), the latter of which was a top 10 hit in Japan. In the 1990s, the immense popularity of Eurobeat in Japan furthered this trend, and the chord progression became so prolific in J-pop to the point where it has become a core part of modern Japanese music.

As of 2023, 40% of the top twenty best selling singles of all time in Japan contain the chord progression, and between 1989 and 2019, the year's top-selling Japanese song contained the progression 23% of the time. Pop music lacking the progression is often described as sounding "not Japanese". While artists' overuse of the ōdō progression can often be criticised as lacking in creative originality, the corpus of songs that become bestsellers in Japan and perform well on Japanese record charts feature plenty of tracks utilising the progression, thus contributing to the conservative nature of record labels that lean towards familiar progressions over more risky experimentation.

== Songs using the progression ==
This is a list of recorded songs containing multiple, repeated uses of the IV^{M7}–V^{7}–iii^{7}–vi and similar progressions.

=== Asian music ===
| Song title | Artist | Year | Progression used | Source |
|---|---|---|---|---|
| "After School" | Weeekly | 2021 | | |
| "Ai no mama ni Wagamama ni Boku wa Kimi dake o Kizutsukenai" (愛のままにわがままに 僕は君だけを傷つけない) | B'z | 1993 | | |
| "Aishiteru no ni, aisenai" (愛してるのに、愛せない) | AAA | 2015 | | |
| "Aku Bukan Jodohnya" | Tri Suaka | 2021 | | |
| "Aku Sayang Aku" | Chintya Gabriella | 2020 | | |
| "Aku Skandal" | Hujan | 2007 | | |
| "Aku Tak Berdosa" | Chossy Pratama | 1999 | | |
| "Alay" | Lolita | 2010 | | |
| "Ambyar Mak Pyar" | Ndarboy Genk | 2021 | IV–V–iii–vi | |
| "Anak Sekolah" | Chrisye, Oddie Agam | 1987 | | |
| "Ano Yume o Nazotte" (あの夢をなぞって) | Yoasobi | 2020 | | |
| "Asuiro Clear Sky" (あすいろClearSky) | Hololive Idol Project | 2021 | | |
| "Baka Mitai" (馬鹿みたい) | Takaya Kuroda | 2015 | | |
| "Berharap Tak Berpisah" | Reza Artamevia | 2003 | | |
| "Bintang Di Hati" | Anto Hoed, Melly Goeslaw | 2018 | | |
| "Bintang Keabadian" | Pongki Barata | 2001 | | |
| "Blue" | Yung Kai | 2024 | | |
| "Blue Bird" | Ayumi Hamasaki | 2006 | | |
| "Blue Bird" (ブルーバード) | Ikimonogakari | 2008 | | |
| "Boku no Migite" (僕の右手) | The Blue Hearts | 1988 | IV–V–iii–vi | |
| "Bola Mata Sayu" | Dnanda | 2025 | IV–V–iii–vi | |
| "Brave Heart" | Ayumi Miyazaki | 1999 | | |
| "Bukan Orangnya" | Juicy Luicy | 2024 | | |
| "Bunda" | Anto Hoed, Melly Goeslaw | 1997 | | |
| "Camouflage" (カムフラージュ) | Mariya Takeuchi | 1998 | | |
| "Cari Pacar Lagi" | ST12 | 2008 | | |
| "Capture the Moment" | Hololive Idol Project | 2024 | | |
| "Ceria" | J-Rocks | 2005 | | |
| "Chang Hei" (爭氣) | Joey Yeung | 2002 | IV–V–iii^{7}–vi | |
| "Chu, Tayōsei" | Ano | 2022 | | |
| "Cintaku Padamu" | Ita Purnamasari | 1992 | | |
| "Cinta Terbaik" | Cassandra | 2017 | | |
| "Cloudy Sheep" (曇天羊) | Tsunomaki Watame,Mori Calliope | 2020 | | |
| "Connect" | ClariS | 2011 | | |
| "Dari Mata" | Jaz | 2016 | | |
| "Dekat Di Hati" | RAN | 2013 | | |
| "Doakan Aku Tegar" | Mutia Ayu | 2023 | | |
| "Dongaku Nggo Kowe" | SlemanReceh | 2020 | IV–V–iii–vi | |
| "Don't say "lazy"" | Yōko Hikasa, Aki Toyosaki, Satomi Satō, Minako Kotobuki | 2009 | | |
| "Donut Hole" (ドーナツホール) | Hachi | 2013 | IV^{add9}–V–iii^{7}–vi^{7} | |
| "Dream Story" | Tokino Sora | 2019 | | |
| "Egao no genki" (笑顔のゲンキ) | SMAP | 1992 | | |
| "End of a Life" | Mori Calliope | 2021 | | |
| "Everything" | Misia | 2000 | | |
| Fake Fake Fake | AZKi | 2019 | | |
| "Fragile" | Every Little Thing | 2001 | | |
| "Full Senyum Sayang" | Evan Loss | 2022 | | |
| "Future Gazer" | FripSide | 2010 | | |
| "Galih & Ratna" | Guruh Sukarnoputra | 1980 | | |
| "Gelaende ga tokeru hodo koishitai" (ゲレンデがとけるほど恋したい) | Kohmi Hirose | 1995 | | |
| "Glory to Hong Kong" | Thomas DGX YHL | 2019 | IV–V–I–vi | |
| "Go! Go! Maniac" | Yōko Hikasa, Aki Toyosaki, Satomi Satō, Minako Kotobuki | 2010 | | |
| "God knows..." | Aya Hirano | 2006 | | |
| "Gravity" | Luna Sea | 2000 | | |
| "Guarana" (ガラナ) | Sukima Switch | 2006 | | |
| "Hajimari no Signal" (はじまりのSignal) | Saori Ōnishi | 2021 | | |
| "Hakanaku mo Towa no Kanashi" (儚くも永久のカナシ) | Uverworld | 2008 | | |
| "Half Moon·Serenade" (ハーフムーン・セレナーデ/月半小夜曲) | Naoko Kawai (Hacken Lee) | 1986 (Hacken Lee vers.: 1987) | IV–V–iii–vi | |
| "Hanabi" | Mr. Children | 2008 | | |
| "Haneuma Rider" (ハネウマライダー) | Porno Graffitti | 2006 | | |
| "Hard Life" (命硬) | Justin Lo | 2005 | IV–V–iii–vi | |
| "Harusnya Aku" | Armada | 2014 | | |
| "Heavy Rotation" (ヘビーローテーション) | AKB48 | 2010 | IV–V–I–vi | |
| "Hero" | Exile | 2004 | | |
| "Hissatsu Teleport" (必殺テレポート) | AKB48 | 2008 | | |
| "Hitomi o Tojite" (瞳をとじて) | Ken Hirai | 2004 | | |
| "Hitomi no Juunin" (瞳の住人) | L'Arc-en-Ciel | 2004 | | |
| "Hotaru no Hikari" (ホタルノヒカリ) | Ikimonogakari | 2009 | | |
| I Just Wanna Say I L U | Potret | 2008 | | |
| Ignite | Eir Aoi | 2014 | | |
| "Impian Cinta" | Dwiki Dharmawan | 1994 | | |
| "Indah Cintaku" | Nicky Tirta, Vanessa Angel | 2010 | | |
| "Indonesia Jaya" | Chaken Matulatuwa; first sung and popularized by Harvey Malaiholo | 1987 | IV–V–iii–vi–ii–V–I–I^{7} (pre-chorus) | |
| "Indonesia Jaya" | Fatin Shidqia, Citra Scholastika, Ayu Ting Ting, Petra Sihombing, Angel Pieters, BagasDifa | 2013 | IV–V–iii–vi | |
| "Infatuated Me" (痴心的我) | Leslie Cheung | 1985 | IV–V–iii–vi | |
| "Ingat-Ingat Kamu" | Maisaka | 2016 | | |
| "Itoshi no Ellie" (いとしのエリー) | Southern All Stars | 1979 | | |
| "Itte" (言って。) | Yorushika | 2017 | | |
| "Jadikan Aku Pacarmu (J.A.P)" | Sheila on 7 | 1999 | | |
| "Jaga Slalu Hatimu" | Seventeen | 2011 | | |
| "Juwita Hatiku" | J-Rocks | 2007 | | |
| "Kaisou Ressha" (海想列車) | Minato Aqua | 2021 | | |
| Kalah | Aftershine | 2023 | | |
| "Kanashii iro ya ne" (悲しい色やね) | Masaki Ueda | 1982 | | |
| "Kanashimi wo Yasashisa ni" (悲しみをやさしさに) | Little by Little | 2003 | | |
| "Kanzen kankaku Dreamer" (完全感覚Dreamer) | One Ok Rock | 2010 | | |
| "Kasmaran" | Phantom | 2010 | | |
| "Kawaikute Gomen" (可愛くてごめん) | HoneyWorks | 2022 | | |
| "Keagungan Tuhan" | Ida Laila | 1964 | | |
| "Kesepian" | Dygta | 2007 | | |
| "Kimagure Romantic" (気まぐれロマンティック) | Ikimonogakari | 2008 | | |
| "Kimi ga Iru Dake de" (君がいるだけで) | Kome Kome Club | 1992 | | |
| "Kimi ni Todoke" (きみにとどけ) | Tomofumi Tanizawa | 2009 | IVmaj7 – V – iii7 – vi7 | |
| "Kita Bikin Romantis" | Maliq & D'Essentials | 2024 | | |
| "Kita Usahakan Lagi" | Batas Senja | 2025 | | |
| "Klebus" | Guyon Waton | 2022 | | |
| "Koiiro" (恋色) | Mosawo | 2022 | | |
| "Ku Menunggu" | Rossa | 2010 | | |
| "Kuat Kita Bersinar" | Superman Is Dead | 2008 | | |
| "Kupu-Kupu" | Tiara Andini | 2024 | | |
| "Legend" (你是你本身的傳奇) | Charmaine Fong | 2015 | IV^{Δ7}–V^{7♭9}–iii^{7}–vi^{7} | |
| "Laksana Surgaku" | Dudy Oris | 2021 | | |
| "Lamunan" | Arya Galih | 2024 | IV–V–iii–vi | |
| "Lies and Truth" | L'Arc-en-Ciel | 1996 | | |
| "Loveable" (사랑스러워) | Kim Jong-kook | 2005 | IV^{M7}–V^{7}–III^{7}–VI^{7} | |
| "Love Machine" (LOVEマシーン) | Morning Musume | 1999 | | |
| "Love Rush" | Takanashi Kiara | 2023 | | |
| "Love Scenario" | Ikon | 2018 | | |
| "Love So Sweet" | Arashi | 2007 | | |
| "Luka Luka Night Fever" (ルカルカ★ナイトフィーバー) | Samfree | 2009 | | |
| "Lumpuhkanlah Ingatanku" | Geisha | 2014 | IV–V–iii–vi | |
| "Mandi Biar Wangi☆Washa Washa!)" | Kobo Kanaeru | 2024 | | |
| "Mantra Hujan" | Kobo Kanaeru | 2022 | | |
| "Masih Cinta" | Kotak | 2024 | | |
| "Mattete Ai no Uta" (待ってて愛のうた) | Aqours | 2016 | | |
| "Mayoiuta" | MyGO!!!! | 2022 | | |
| "Meikyū Love Song" (迷宮ラブソング) | Arashi | 2011 | | |
| "Melangkah Di Atas Awan" | Ronnie Sianturi | 1997 | | |
| "Melukis Senja" | Budi Syahbudin | 2020 | | |
| "Me Gustas Tu" (오늘부터 우리는) | GFriend | 2015 | | |
| "Menemukanmu" | Seventeen | 2010 | | |
| "Mengejar Mimpi" | Yovie & Nuno | 2010 | | |
| "Menghapus Jejakmu" | Noah | 2007 | | |
| "Merindu Lagi (Pada Kekasih Orang)" | Yovie & Nuno | 2010 | | |
| "Michizure" (みちづれ) | Hoshimachi Suisei | 2023 | | |
| "Miku Miku ni Shite Ageru" (みくみくにしてあげる) | Tsuruta Kamo | 2007 | | |
| "Mimpi Terindah" | Tofu | 2001 | IV–V–iii–vi | |
| "Mirai e" (未来へ) | Kiroro | 1998 | IV–V–iii–vi | |
| "Monolog" | Pamungkas | 2018 | | |
| "Moshimo" (もしも) | Daisuke | 2007 | | |
| "Mou Koi Nante Shinai (もう恋なんてしない)" | Noriyuki Makihara | 1992 | IV–V–iii–vi (chorus) | |
| "Natsuiro Egao de 1,2,Jump!" (夏色えがおで1,2,Jump!) | μ's | 2011 | | |
| "Natsuiro Egao de 1,2,Jump!" (夏色えがおで1,2,Jump!) | μ's | 2011 | | |
| "Negeri Di Awan" | Andre Manika, Katon Bagaskara | 1994 | | |
| "Negoro Angin" | Denny Caknan | 2026 | IV–V–iii–vi | |
| "New Journey" | Hakui Koyori | 2024 | | |
| "Next Color Planet" | Hoshimachi Suisei | 2020 | | |
| "Never Forget" (ja:忘れてやらない) | Kessoku Band | 2022 | | |
| "Niwaka Ame ni Mo Makezu" (ニワカ雨ニモ負ケズ) | Nico Touches the Walls | 2013 | | |
| "Nostalgia SMA" | Paramitha Rusady | 1988 | | |
| "Omega Cat" (ω猫) | AZKi | 2023 | | |
| "Only My Railgun" | FripSide | 2009 | | |
| "Orange" | Rie Kugimiya, Yui Horie, Eri Kitamura | 2009 | | |
| "Orange" (オレンジ) | 7!! | 2011 | | |
| "Oribia o Kikinagara" (オリビアを聴きながら) | Anri | 1978 | | |
| "Pacar Rahasia" | Cappucino | 2010 | | |
| "Pergi Pagi Pulang Pagi" | Armada | 2014 | | |
| "Perlahan" | Guyon Waton | 2020 | | |
| "Pieces" | L'Arc-en-Ciel | 1999 | | |
| "Pisah" | Guyon Waton | 2021 | | |
| "Putri Iklan" | ST 12 | 2008 | IV–V–I–vi | |
| "Rapsodi" | JKT48 | 2020 | | |
| "Risalah Hati" | Dewa 19 | 2000 | | |
| "Rise" | Tsukumo Sana, Ceres Fauna, Nanashi Mumei, Ouro Kronii, Hakos Baelz | 2022 | | |
| "Robinson" (ロビンソン) | Spitz | 1995 | | |
| "Rungkad" | Vicky Trip, Happy Asmara | 2022 | | |
| "Sakura" (さくら) | Ketsumeishi | 2005 | | |
| "Satukanlah" | Alda | 2007 | | |
| "Sayang" | Via Vallen | 2016 | | |
| "Sebatas Mimpi" | Nano | 2009 | | |
| "Season in the Sun" (シーズン・イン・ザ・サン) | Tube | 1989 | | |
| "Seiza ni Naretara" (ja:星座になれたら) | Kessoku Band | 2022 | | |
| "Sekai de Ichiban Atsui Natsu" (世界でいちばん熱い夏) | Princess Princess | 1987 | | |
| "Sekitar Kita" | Krakatau | 1992 | | |
| "Selimut Tetangga" | Repvblik | 2014 | | |
| "Shiny Smily Story" | Hololive Idol Project | 2019 | | |
| "Shiawase" (幸せ) | Back Number | 2011 | | |
| "Shirushi" (シルシ) | Lisa Oribe | 2014 | | |
| "Sigar" | Denny Caknan | 2024 | | |
| "Silky Heart" | Yui Horie | 2009 | | |
| "Siu Shing Tai Shi" (小城大事) | Miriam Yeung | 2004 | IV–V–iii–vi | |
| "Sky Sonar" (スカイソナー) | Shiranui Flare | 2023 | | |
| "Snow Halation" | μ's | 2010 | | |
| "Song of the Year" (年度之歌) | Kay Tse | 2009 | IV–V–iii–vi | |
| "Sotsugyō Shashin" (卒業写真) | Yumi Matsutoya | 1975 | | |
| Spontan (tanpa) UHUY! | Deabdil | 2025 | IV–V–iii–VI (chorus) | |
| "Stand By Me" | SHINee | 2009 | | |
| "Start:Dash!!" | μ's | 2013 | | |
| "Stecu Stecu" | Faris Adam | 2025 | | |
| "Sumpah Ku Mencintaimu" | Seventeen | 2013 | | |
| "Sunset di Tanah Anarki" | Superman Is Dead | 2013 | IV–V–I–vi | |
| "Super Driver" | Aya Hirano | 2009 | | |
| "Sweet Dream" | Jang Na-ra | 2002 | | |
| "Tabun" (たぶん) | Yoasobi | 2020 | IV^{Δ7}–V–^{7}–iii^{7}–vi^{7} | |
| "Tak Punya Nyali" | d'Masiv | 2016 | | |
| "Takut" | Vierra | 2011 | | |
| "Tang" (等) | Danny Chan | 1985 | IV–iii^{7}–vi | |
| "Tenshi no Agape" (天使のagape) | Amane Kanata | 2021 | | |
| "Terima Kasih Pak Jokowi" | Kang Lidan | 2024 | IV–V–I–vi | |
| "The End" (到此為止) | Shiga Lin | 2012 | IV–V–iii–vi | |
| "Tiba-Tiba" | Quinn Salman | 2022 | | |
| "Tiba-Tiba Cinta Datang" | Maudy Ayunda | 2011 | | |
| "To You" (그대에게) | Muhangwedo, Shin Hae-chul (writer) | 1988 | IV–V–iii–vi | |
| "Tokimeki Scramble" (ときめきスクランブル) | Mio Hoshitani (as Mayano Top Gun) | 2022 | | |
| "Tresno Liyane" | Northsle | 2020 | IV–V–I–vi | |
| "Tsuukai Ukiuki Doori" (痛快ウキウキ通り) | Kenji Ozawa | 2003 | | |
| "Tuhan Jagakan Dia" | Motif Band | 2017 | | |
| "Uchiage Hanabi" (打上花火) | Daoko, Kenshi Yonezu | 2017 | | |
| "Umapyoi Densetsu" (うまぴょい伝説) | Uma Musume | 2016 | | |
| "Unavoidable" (無可避免) | Dear Jane | 2019 | IV^{sus}–V^{sus}–iii–vi^{7} | |
| "uni-birth" | Minato Aqua | 2022 | | |
| "Unmei no Roulette Mawashite" (運命のルーレット廻して) | Zard | 1998 | | |
| "Untungnya, Hidup Harus Tetap Berjalan" | Bernadya | 2024 | | |
| "Utauyo!!MIRACLE" | Yōko Hikasa, Aki Toyosaki, Satomi Satō, Minako Kotobuki | 2010 | | |
| "Wa" (와) | Lee Jung Hyun | 1999 | | |
| Wanita Yang Kau Pilih | Rossa | 2004 | | |
| "Wataridori" (ワタリドリ) | [Alexandros] | 2015 | IV–V–III^{7}–vi | |
| "Watashi no Ichiban Kawaii Tokoro" (わたしの一番かわいいところ) | Fruits Zipper | 2022 | | |
| "We Always Together" | Gusti Irwan Wibowo | 2025 | IV–V–iii–vi (chorus) | |
| "Well, dadah" | Aya Anjani | 2025 | | |
| "White Love" | Speed | 1997 | | |
| "Widodari" | Denny Caknan, Guyon Waton | 2021 | | |
| "Wonderful Rush" | μ's | 2012 | | |
| "Yau Sam Yan" (有心人) | Leslie Cheung | 1996 | IV–V–iii–vi | |
| "Yes-No" | Off Course | 1980 | | |
| "Yoru ni Kakeru" (夜に駆ける) | Yoasobi | 2019 | IV^{Δ7}–V^{7}–iii–vi^{7} | |
| "Yoru ni Kakeru" (夜に駆ける) | Yoasobi | 2019 | | |
| "White Love" | Speed | 1997 | | |
| "Yumezora Fanfare" (ja:ユメゾラ☆ファンファーレ) | Tokino Sora | 2022 | | |
| "Zurui onna" (ズルい女) | Sharam Q | 1995 | | |
| "Zenryoku shōnen" (全力少年) | Sukima Switch | 2005 | | |

=== Western music ===
In Western music, the progression is sometimes seen without the seventh notes, or with some substitution for one of the chords in the progression. Examples include:

| Song title | Artist | Year | Progression used | Recorded key | Sources |
|---|---|---|---|---|---|
| "5:15" | The Who | 1973 | IV^{M7}–V^{7}–iii^{6/5}–vi^{4/2} | N/A | |
| "Dilemma" | Nelly, Kelly Rowland | 2002 | ii^{7}–V–iii^{7}–vi | F major | |
| "Never Gonna Give You Up" | Rick Astley | 1987 | iv^{9}–VII^{7}–v^{7}–i | B♭ minor | |
| "Together Forever" | Rick Astley | 1988 | IV^{M7}–V^{7}–iii^{7}–vi^{7}, IV^{M7}–V^{7}–iii^{7}–vi^{7}–ii^{6/5}–V^{7}–I | D major | |
| Não quero dinheiro (Só quero amar) | Tim Maia | 1971 | IV–V^{4/2}–iii–vi–ii–V–I (chorus only) | A major | |
| Me Atraiu | Gabriela Rocha | 2023 | IV–V–iii–vi | G major | |
| "4 in the Morning" | Gwen Stefani | 2006 | IV–V–iii–vi (chorus only) | E♭ major | |
| "Titanium" | David Guetta, Sia | 2011 | IV–V–iii–vi VI–VII–v–i | E♭ major C minor | |
| "Leave the Door Open" | Silk Sonic | 2021 | IV–V–iii–vi | C major | |
| "Didn't We Almost Have It All" | Whitney Houston | 1987 | IV–V–iii–vi | B♭ major | |
| "Italodancer" | Floorfilla | 2001 | VI–VII–v–i (chorus only) | E minor | |
| "It's Gonna Be Me" | Nsync | 2000 | VI–VII–v–i | C minor | |
| "Cruel to Be Kind" | Nick Lowe | 1979 | IV–V–iii–vi | C major | |
| "Starlight" | Taylor Swift | 2012, 2021 (Taylor's Version) | IV–V–iii–vi, IV–V–I–vi | E major | |
| "Holiday Road" | Lindsey Buckingham | 1983 | IV–V–iii–vi (chorus only) | F major | |
| "Peaches" | Jack Black | 2023 | VI–VII–v–i (intro/chorus) | B♭ minor | |
| "Clumsy" | All Time Low | 2020 | VI–VII–v–i | C# minor | |
| "Saturn" | Stevie Wonder | 1976 | IV–V4/2–iii–vi–ii–V7–I | C major | |
| "Part of Your World" | Alan Menken, Howard Ashman | 1989 | IV–V4/2–iii–vi (bridge, line 1) IV–V–V^{7}/vi–vi (bridge, line 3) | F major | |
| "Fortnight" | Taylor Swift, Post Malone | 2024 | IV–V–iii–vi | B major | |
| "Ghost Town" | Benson Boone | 2021 | IV–V–iii–vi | C major | |
| "Little Fury Things" | Dinosaur Jr. | 1987 | IV–V^{add4}–iii^{7}–IV^{add9} | A major | |
| "Good Luck, Babe!" | Chappell Roan | 2024 | | D major | |
| "What a Beautiful Name" | Hillsong Worship | 2016 | IV–V–vi–iii (bridge only) | D major | |
| "Holy Forever" | Chris Tomlin | 2022 | IV–V–iii–vi–ii (chorus) / IV–V–vi–ii (bridge) | Db major | |

The Princess Kenny theme from South Park also used this chord progression. It contains western music imitating Japanese anime.

== In classical music ==
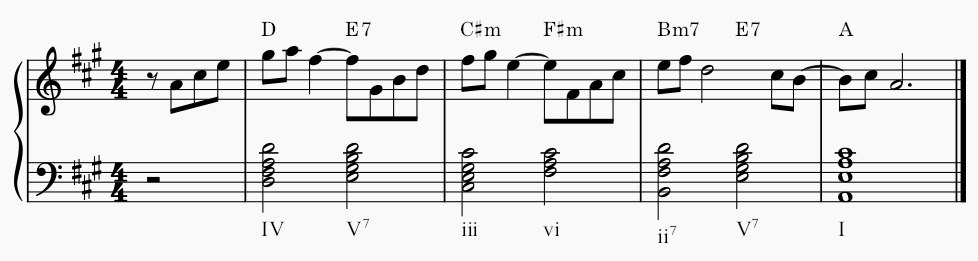
IV–V^{7}–iii–vi–ii^{7}–V^{7}–I progression the third movement of Rachmaninoff's Symphony No. 2

Sergei Rachmaninoff's Symphony No. 2 features a IV–V^{7}–iii–vi–ii^{7}–V^{7}–I sequence in the third movement.

Camille Saint-Saens' Aquarium movement from The Carnival of the Animals features an Am-F(Aug5)-G-E7 chord progression in A minor.

"Grillen" by Robert Schumann includes a GbM7-Ab-F7/A-Bbm progression.

== See also ==
- I–V–vi–IV progression – four chord progression commonly used in Western pop music
- vi–IV–V–I progression – commonly known as the "Komuro progression" (小室進行, komuro shinkō), namesake of Tetsuya Komuro who popularised the progression.
- IV–vii°–iii–vi–ii–V–I – circle of fifths progression
