= J-rock (disambiguation) =

J-rock is an abbreviation for Japanese rock music.

"J-rock" may also refer to:

- J-Rock, a member of the United Kingdom band Big Brovaz
- J-Rocks, an Indonesian rock band

== See also ==
- J-Roc (disambiguation)
- Jay Rock
