= Mien Brodjo =

- Born: Siti Sukatminah Brodjoewiryo; 11 March 1937; Yogyakarta, Special Region of Yogyakarta, Dutch East Indies
- Died: 12 July 2021 (aged 84); Yogyakarta, Special Region of Yogyakarta, Indonesia
- Occupations: Actress; painter; athlete

Siti Sukatminah Brodjoewirjo (11 March 1937 – 12 July 2021), also known as Mien Brodjo, was an Indonesian actress, painter, and athlete.

== Early life ==
Mien Brodjo was born Siti Sukatminah Brodjoewirjo on 11 March 1937 in Yogyakarta, Special Region of Yogyakarta. A Javanese woman who would later be known as Mien Brodjo, she was relatively fortunate because, despite being born in Yogyakarta during the Dutch colonial era, her father was a mantri pamicis for the Dutch Colonial Government at the time. A mantri pamicis was a position equivalent to a head of the taxation department, which allowed Mien Brodjo and her family to live comfortably. Additionally, Mien Brodjo was instilled with discipline from a young age, including time management. This was because her father was strict in enforcing discipline among his children, including Mien Brodjo, due to his work environment, which often involved interaction with Europeans, particularly those from the Netherlands.

However, when Japan arrived and occupied Indonesia, the comfortable life of Mien Brodjo's family changed drastically. Her father lost his job. To help support the family, Mien Brodjo's mother sold batik cloth. It was her mother's courage and resilience that Mien Brodjo would always remember as she grew older. Despite her family facing significant hardships during this challenging period and living through Indonesia's wartime era, Mien Brodjo still enjoyed her childhood by playing with friends her age.

== Career ==
From a young age, Mien Brodjo recognized her interest and talent in acting. This sparked her desire to enroll in an art school. However, her parents did not allow her to pursue this path due to concerns about the uncertain future of a career as an artist. Although initially disappointed, Mien Brodjo did not dwell on her sadness for long. After graduating from junior high school, she enrolled in the Sekolah Guru Pendidikan Djasmani (Physical Education Teachers School; SGPD) in 1958. SGPD was a four-year secondary-level school that trained students to become physical education and health teachers.

During her early education at SGPD, Mien Brodjo approached her studies with great responsibility. Her dedication was reflected in her satisfactory grades, especially in gymnastics and swimming. However, even though she was deeply involved in various school activities, Mien Brodjo could not suppress her passion for the arts. In her spare time, particularly when she was in her third year at SGPD, she often visited the Akademi Seni Drama dan Film Indonesia (Indonesian Film and Drama Academy; Asdrafi) in Yogyakarta. Asdrafi was a renowned institution that produced many influential figures in Indonesian cinema, such as Teguh Karya and Putu Wijaya.

At Asdrafi, Mien Brodjo absorbed a wealth of knowledge and gained valuable experience, whether through discussions or socializing with students and the artistic community there. She was often invited to participate in drama productions, including Domba-Domba Revolusi directed by Koesno Soedjarwadi, Malam Pengantin di Bukit Kera, and Malam Jahanam directed by Motinggo Busye. However, Mien Brodjo's enthusiasm for acting activities had an impact on her academic performance. Her grades declined, and when she advanced to the fourth year—the final stage of education at SGPD—she passed with barely acceptable marks. As a result, she was placed in class 4D, a group designated for less academically inclined students and those considered unruly or undisciplined. Meanwhile, the more intelligent, disciplined, and compliant students were placed in classes 4A, 4B, and 4C, sorted by their levels of academic and behavioral excellence.

After graduating from SGPD, due to her service bond, Mien Brodjo, who graduated among the top three in her class, continued her education at the Sekolah Tinggi Olahraga (High School of Sport; STO) in Yogyakarta in 1965. This was somewhat at odds with her aspirations, as she had hoped to pursue her interest and talent in acting by studying at Asdrafi in Yogyakarta, especially since she had already been active in the performing arts during her time at SGPD.

To pursue her passion for theater, Mien Brodjo interacted with several renowned theater artists, including W.S. Rendra, Koesno Soedjarwadi, Putu Wijaya, and many others. She also joined Sanggar Bambu, a theater group led by Soenarto Pr in Rotowijayan, Yogyakarta. During this time, Mien Brodjo began performing more frequently in drama productions in Yogyakarta.

Mien Brodjo's career in acting began to flourish when she appeared in a feature film for the first time. She made her film debut in 1963 in Tangan-Tangan Jang Kotor, directed by Sunjoto. Although she only played a supporting role, Mien Brodjo delivered a convincing performance as a newcomer to the Indonesian film industry at the time. It didn’t take long for her career to progress; just four years later, in 1967, Mien Brodjo starred as the lead actress in her second film, Mutiara yang Hilang. From then on, she appeared in dozens of films and several soap operas.

In 1988, Mien Brodjo was offered the opportunity to appear in a television drama on TVRI, the soap opera Dokter Sartika, which was regularly broadcast as a series until 1991. In Dokter Sartika, she acted alongside other actresses, including Dewi Yull and Dwi Yan. Mien Brodjo also appeared in the soap opera Noktah Merah Perkawinan, which aired on Indosiar in 1996, alongside Cok Simbara, Ayu Azhari, and Berliana Febrianti.

== Personal life ==
=== Death ===
Mien Brodjo died at 84 at Bethesda Hospital in Yogyakarta, Special Region of Yogyakarta, on 12 July 2021 due to an illness.

== Filmography ==
- Tangan Tangan Jang Kotor (1963)
- Mutiara Hitam (1967)
- Petani dan Hari Depan (1967)
- Sisa-sisa Laskar Padjang (1972)
- Tabah Sampai Akhir (1973)
- Pelarian (1973)
- Benyamin Spion 025 (1974)
- Sentuhan Cinta (1976)
- Perawan Desa (1978)
- Mencari Cinta (1979)
- Si Pincang (1979)
- Buah Terlarang (1979)
- Bayang-Bayang Kelabu (1979)
- Yang Kembali Bersemi (1980)
- Ratu Ilmu Hitam (1981)
- Anakku Terlibat (1983)
- Ranjau-Ranjau Cinta (1984)
- Arie Hanggara (1985)
- Pertunangan (1985)
- Madu dan Racun (1985)
- Gejolak Cinta Pertama (1985)
- Merangkul Langit (1986)
- Balada Cewek Jagoan (1986)
- Anak-Anak Malam (1986)
- Si Badung (1989)
- Misteri dari Gunung Merapi III (1990)
- Sekretaris (1991)
- Setetes Noda Manis (1994)

== Soap opera ==
- Sartika (1989–1991)
- Noktah Merah Perkawinan (1996)
- Melangkah Di Atas Awan (1997–1998)
- Gadis Kuntilanak (1999)
