= Melangkah Di Atas Awan (song) =

1997 song by Surya Saputra or Ronnie Sianturi

Single by Ronnie Sianturi

from the album Melangkah Di Atas Awan
- Language: Indonesian
- English title: "A Walk in the Clouds"
- Released: December 1997
- Genre: Pop
- Length: 4:14
- Label: Musica
- Composer: Dwiki Dharmawan
- Lyricists: Eddy D. Iskandar; Putu Wijaya
- Producer: Dwiki Dharmawan

Ronnie Sianturi singles chronology
"Sudikah Kamu" (1994)	"Melangkah Di Atas Awan" (1997)	"Kembalilah" (2000)

Audio sample
- file; help

Music video
- "Melangkah Di Atas Awan" on YouTube

"Melangkah Di Atas Awan" (English: "A walk in the clouds" or "Walking in the clouds"; also known as "Melangkah Di Awan") is the theme song from the 1997 musical television series of the same name. Two versions of the song featured in the series: one performed by actor Surya Saputra as the fictional singer Yudi, and a credits version performed by Indonesian real-life singer Ronnie Sianturi. Sianturi's version was released as the lead single of his compilation album of the same name by Musica Studios in December 1997.

Upon its release, "Melangkah Di Atas Awan" received generally positive reviews by music critics, who complimented popularity on Sianturi's solo career. Commercially, the song peaked at number five on Aneka Top 13 Hits Indonesia, becoming Sianturi's second song to chart. Retrospective reviews considered it as one of the most popular songs written by Dwiki Dharmawan.

== Background, release and promotion ==
Prior to the release of "Melangkah Di Atas Awan", Sianturi debuted his solo career in 1994 with his debut album Sudikah Kamu, which featured a successful single of the same name. In an interview with Surabaya Post on July 21, 1997, when the series' theme song went into development, Peggy Melati Sukma, who portrayed Ayu, revealed that she wrote the initial lyrics for the song. It later eventually released in December 1997 on Sianturi's solo compilation album of the same name, nearly three months after the series' premiere.

To promote "Melangkah Di Atas Awan", Sianturi performed the song on various music programs. On January 18, 1998, he performed the song live for the first time on the eighty-eighth episode of the variety show Pentas Sejuta Aksi, in which the show's presenter Becky Tumewu praised his voice and performances.

== Composition ==
"Melangkah Di Atas Awan" was written by Eddy D. Iskandar and Putu Wijaya, with Dwiki Dharmawan participating in the production, composition and arrangement. Lyrically, "Melangkah Di Atas Awan" revolves around wishing and dreaming like flying high, while on the other side describing doubts cause different directions disharmonizing in love. The lyrics "It is hard to make me feel happy/When directions are different" (Note: Original: "Tak mudah meraih bahagia/Bila arah saling berbeda") shows the conflict between the dream and the reality that everyone experienced.

== Music video ==
A music video for the song released in early 1998. On January 31, 2020, a remastered version of the video was uploaded on Musica Studios' YouTube channel. As of October 25, 2024, the video has amassed over 1 million views.

== Credits and personnel ==
Credits are adapted from the liner notes of Melangkah Di Atas Awan.

Personnel

- Ronnie Sianturi — lead vocals
- Dwiki Dharmawan — composition, arrangement
- Eddy D. Iskandar — lyrics
- Putu Wijaya — lyrics
- Indrawati Widjaja — executive

== Reception ==
=== Initial reception ===
"Melangkah Di Atas Awan" was met with positive reviews from music critics. Nini Sunny of NewsMusik wrote that the theme song gain its popularity, while Sianturi pursuing his solo career after Trio Libels' hiatus.

=== Later reception ===
Tedy Ahmad, writing for iNews Bekasi, described "Melangkah Di Atas Awan" as a boost for Dwiki's popularity.

== Commercial performance ==
Prior to the official release, "Melangkah Di Atas Awan" entered number five on the Aneka Top 13 Hits Indonesia chart, on the chart issue dated November 15, 1997.

== Live performance ==
Outside of the series' context, Sianturi included "Melangkah Di Atas Awan" on the set list of Musik Eraku concert, which took place at Balai Sarbini on August 5, 2023.

== Release history ==
Release dates and formats for "Melangkah Di Atas Awan"
Country	Date	Format	Label	Notes
Indonesia	December 1997	Cassette, CD	Musica	
Indonesia	January 2020	Radio airplay	Musica	Remastered
Various	January 2020	Digital download, streaming	Musica	Remastered

== Charts ==
Chart performance for "Melangkah Di Atas Awan"
Chart (1997)	Peak position
Indonesia (Aneka)	5

== Collaborating Harmony version ==
"Melangkah Di Atas Awan"

Song by Alex Rudiart

from the album Collaborating Harmony: Dwiki Dharmawan
- Language: Indonesian
- Released: February 6, 2014
- Genre: Pop rock
- Length: 4:28
- Label: Sony Indonesia
- Composer: Dwiki Dharmawan
- Lyricist: Eddy D. Iskandar

On February 6, 2014, the X Factor Indonesia season 1 finalist Alex Rudiart covered "Melangkah Di Atas Awan" for the compilation album Collaborating Harmony: Dwiki Dharmawan, marking the first time that the song was included on Dwiki's tribute release. Kerispatih keyboardist Badai re-arranged it as part of Dwiki's tribute project in celebration of his thirtieth debut anniversary. In an interview on Indonesia Morning Show, Rudiart, then only 27, revealed that he was originally chosen to cover Ita Purnamasari's "Deru Debu"; however he decided to perform a cover of "Melangkah Di Atas Awan" instead. His version also received positive reviews, with Rudiart's "dazzling" performance and the arrangement was made different, "fresher" than the original.

=== Personnel ===
Credits are adapted from album's liner notes.

- Jan Djuhana — executive
- Badai — arrangement, keyboards
- Dwiki Dharmawan — original writer
- Eddy D. Iskandar — lyrics

== Dirly Dave version ==
"Melangkah Di Atas Awan"
- Digital cover

Single by Dirly Dave and Dwiki Dharmawan
- Language: Indonesian
- Released: June 27, 2025
- Genre: Orchestral pop
- Length: 4:20
- Label: Legenda Indonesia
- Composer: Dwiki Dharmawan
- Lyricist: Eddy D. Iskandar

Dwiki Dharmawan singles chronology
"Barandai" (2025)	"Melangkah Di Atas Awan" (2025)

Music video
- "Melangkah Di Atas Awan" (Dwiki Dharmawan and Dirly Dave version) on YouTube

In 2025, Dirly Dave, the runner-up of Indonesian Idol season 3, covered "Melangkah Di Atas Awan" with an orchestral arrangement by the song's original composer Dwiki Dharmawan. His rendition was surprise-released by Legenda Musik Indonesia on June 27, 2025. A music video for Dirly's rendition was released on August 31 of that year, and was directed by Dinda Anandita and Glenn Rotty. Dirly's rendition was panned by critics, who praised its faithfulness to the song's original melancholic style.

On the 28th Annual Anugerah Musik Indonesia, Dirly's rendition of "Melangkah Di Atas Awan" was nominated in the Top Orchestral Work of the Year category for Dwiki.

=== Credits and personnel ===
Credits adapted from Tidal.

- Dwiki Dharmawan — arrangement, orchestration, production
- Glenn Rotty — co-production, executive
- Eddy D. Iskandar — lyricist

== See also ==
- List of songs by Dwiki Dharmawan
