= I–V–vi–IV progression =

Chord progression

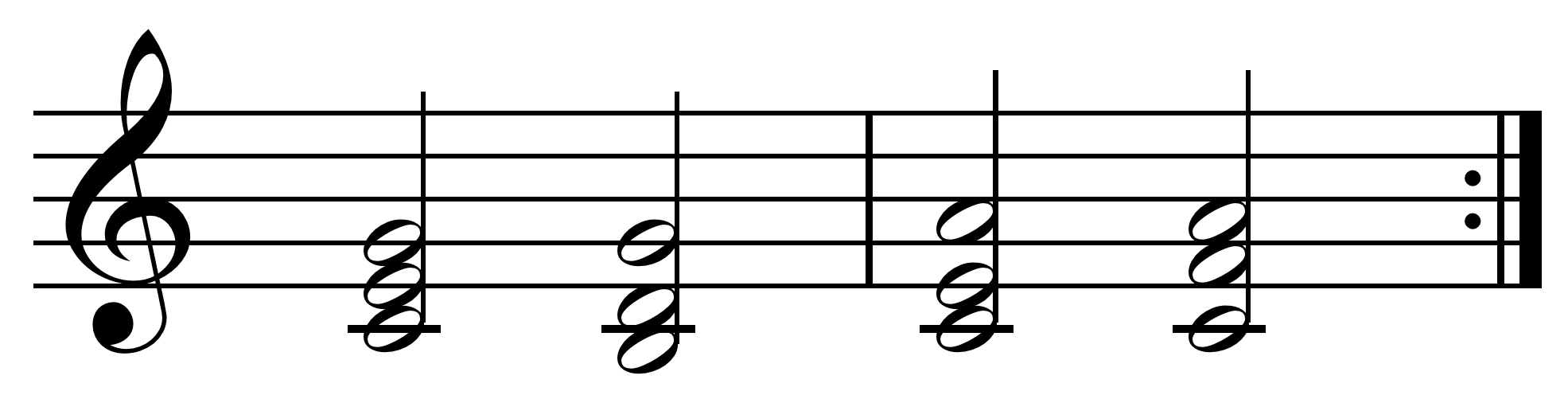
I–V–vi–IV progression in C

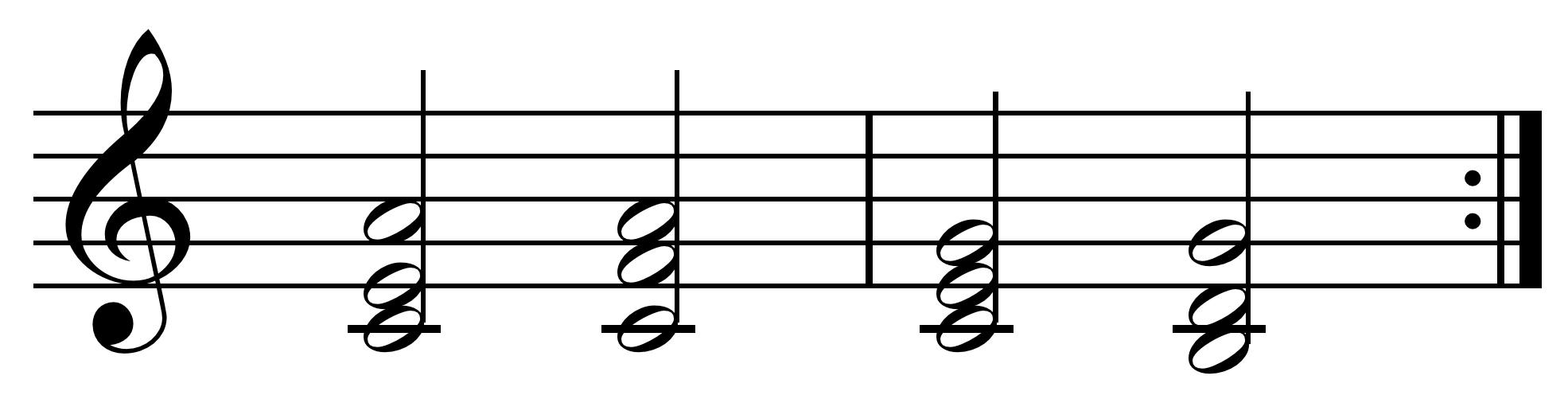
vi–IV–I–V progression in C

The I–V–vi–IV chord progression or Axis progression (named after the Australian comedy rock band The Axis of Awesome, who popularized the chord progression's ubiquity), is a common chord progression popular across several music genres. It uses the I, V, vi, and IV chords of the diatonic scale. For example, in the key of C major, this progression would be C–G–Am–F. Rotations include:

- I–V–vi–IV: C–G–Am–F
- V–vi–IV–I: G–Am–F–C
- vi–IV–I–V: Am–F–C–G
- IV–I–V–vi: F–C–G–Am

The '50s progression uses the same chords but in a different order (I–vi–IV–V), no matter the starting point.

== Variations ==
A common ordering of the progression, "vi–IV–I–V", was dubbed the "sensitive female chord progression" by Boston Globe columnist Marc Hirsh. In C major this would be Am–F–C–G, modulating the key to A minor.

Hirsh first noticed the chord progression in the song "One of Us" by Joan Osborne, and then other songs. He named the progression because he claimed it was used by many performers of the Lilith Fair in the late 1990s. Examples of the progression appeared in pop hits as early as the 1950s, such as in the Teddy Bears' "To Know Him Is to Love Him", written by Phil Spector.

Dan Bennett claims the progression is also called the "pop-punk progression" because of its frequent use in pop punk.

In this ordering, the progression ends with a double plagal cadence in the key of the dominant (in the Mixolydian mode) and could also be respelled ii–♭VII–IV–I, opening with a backdoor turnaround.

The chord progression is also used in the form IV–I–V–vi, as in songs such as "Umbrella" by Rihanna and "Down" by Jay Sean. Numerous bro-country songs followed the chord progression, as demonstrated by Greg Todd's mash-up of several bro-country songs in an early 2015 video.

It is also common to substitute the supertonic (ii) for the submediant (vi) resulting in the similar sounding I–V–ii–IV. This is present in such songs as the Cure's Just Like Heaven, Taylor Swift's Getaway Car, Semisonic's Closing Time and Smash Mouth's All Star.

A 2008 medley by the comedy group the Axis of Awesome, called "Four Chords", demonstrated the ubiquity of the progression in popular music, for comic effect; for instance, as the progression is played as an ostinato, sometimes it is used as a vi–IV–I–V (i. e. the "pessimistic" inversion). It does not accurately represent the chord progressions of all the songs it depicts. It was originally written in D major (thus the progression being D major, A major, B minor, G major) and performed live in the key of E major (thus using the chords E major, B major, C♯ minor, and A major). The song was subsequently published on YouTube. As of May 2020, the two most popular versions have been viewed over 100 million times combined.

The British progressive rock band Porcupine Tree made a song called "Four Chords That Made a Million" that appears to be a satire of the broad use of this progression in contemporary commercial music.

== I–V–♭VII–IV ==
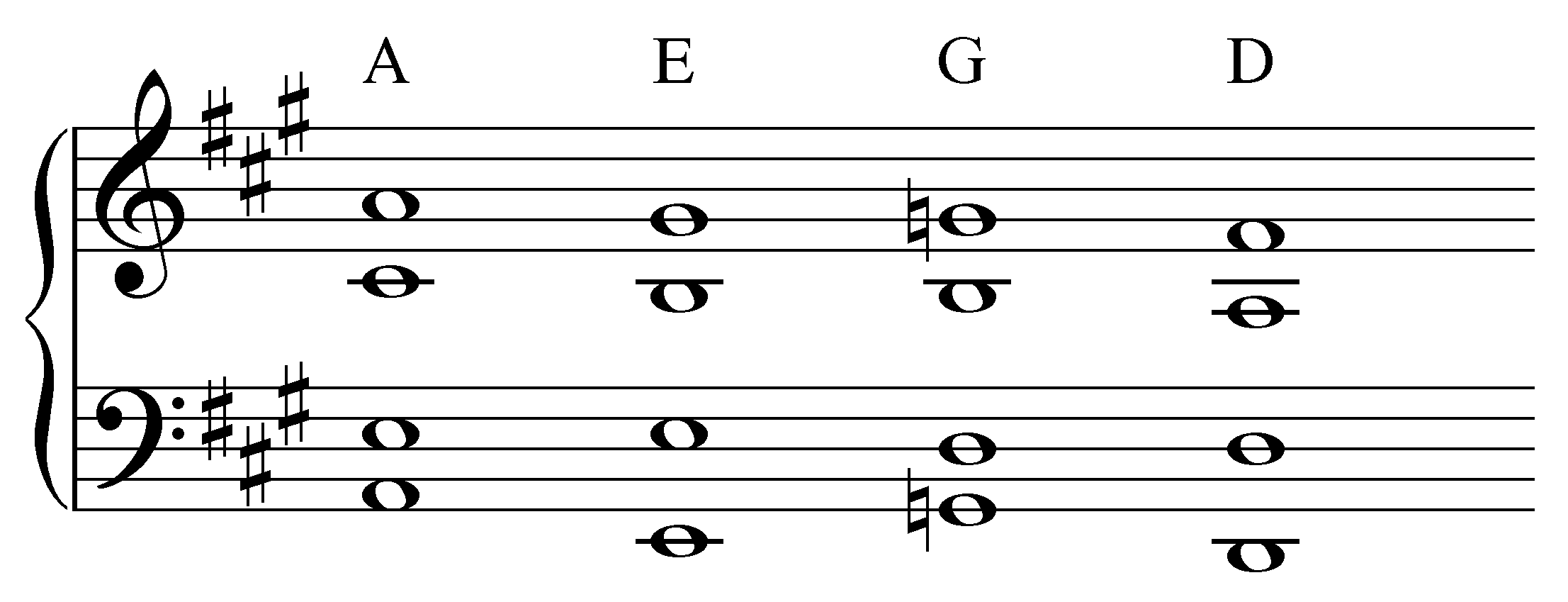
I–V–♭VII–IV in A

I–V–♭VII–IV may be viewed as a variation of I–V–vi–IV, replacing the submediant with the subtonic. It consists of two I–V chord progressions, the second a whole step lower (A–E–G–D = I–V in A and I–V in G), giving it a sort of harmonic drive. There are few keys in which one may play the progression with open chords on the guitar, so it is often portrayed with barre chords ("Lay Lady Lay"). The use of the flattened seventh may lend this progression a bluesy feel or sound, and the whole tone descent may be reminiscent of the ninth and tenth chords of the twelve bar blues (V–IV). The progression also makes possible a chromatic descent across a minor third: $\hat 8$–♯$\hat 7$–♮$\hat 7$–$\hat 6$.

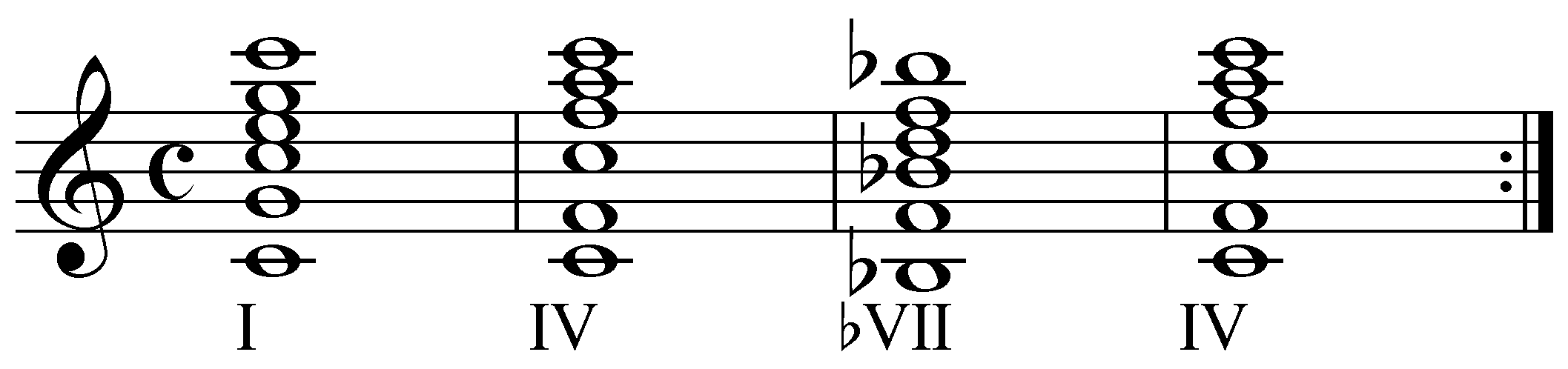
I–IV–♭VII–IV

"(You Make Me Feel Like) A Natural Woman" by Carole King makes prominent use of this progression in its verses. "Lay Lady Lay" uses the similar progression I–iii–♭VII–ii; the second and fourth chords are replaced by the relative minor while preserving the same $\hat 8$–♯$\hat 7$–♮$\hat 7$–$\hat 6$ descent. This progression is used in other songs including "Turning Japanese" (1980) by the Vapors, "Sample in a Jar" (1994) by Phish (I–iii–♭VII–IV), "Waterfalls" (1995) by TLC, and "Don't Tell Me" (2000) by Madonna. "Cinnamon Girl" (1969) by Neil Young uses I–v–♭VII–IV (all in Mixolydian). It opens the verse to "Brown Eyes" by Lady Gaga, is used in the chorus to "Rio" (1982) by Duran Duran and "Sugar Hiccup" (1983) by the Cocteau Twins, and is in the 2nd part of the bridge in "Sweet Jane" (1988) by the Cowboy Junkies. John Maus uses a i–v–VII–iv in c minor for the verse of "Cop Killer" (2011). The progression is also used entirely with minor chords [i–v–vii–iv (g#, d#, f#, c#)] in the middle section of Chopin's etude op. 10 no. 12. However, using the same chord type (major or minor) on all four chords causes it to feel more like a sequence of descending fourths than a bona fide chord progression. I–IV–♭VII–IV is a similar chord progression which is arch formed (I–IV–♭VII–IV–I), and has been used in the chorus to "And She Was" (1985) by Talking Heads, in "Let's Go Crazy" (1984) by Prince, in "Like a Rock" (1986) by Bob Seger, in "Steady, As She Goes" (2006) by the Raconteurs (minor tonic: i–V–♭VII–IV), and in "American Idiot" by Green Day.

== Songs using the progression ==
This is a partial list of recorded songs containing multiple, repeated uses of the I–V–vi–IV progression.

Song title	Artist	Year	Progression	Recorded Key
"10,000 Reasons (Bless the Lord)"	Matt Redman and Jonas Myrin	2012	IV–I–V–vi	G major
"18 And Life"	Skid Row	1989	vi–IV–I–V	C♯ minor
"20 Good Reasons"	Thirsty Merc	2007	I–V–vi–IV	C♯ major
"Africa"	Toto	1982	vi–IV–I–V (chorus)	F♯ minor (chorus)
"Aicha"	Cheb Khaled	1996	vi–IV–I–V	G minor
"Ai Se Eu Te Pego"	Michel Teló	2011	I–V–vi–IV	B major
"All of Me"	John Legend	2013	vi–IV–I–V	A♭ major
"All You Wanted"	Michelle Branch	2002	vi–IV–I–V (chorus)	A♭ major
"All Too Well"	Taylor Swift	2012	I–V–vi–IV	C major
"Almost"	Bowling for Soup	2004	I–V–vi–IV	B major
"Alone"	Heart	1987	vi–IV–I–V	F♯ major (chorus)
"Alone"	Alan Walker	2016	vi–IV–I–V	G minor
"Amaranth"	Nightwish	2007	vi–IV–I–V	D minor
"A New Day Has Come"	Celine Dion	2002	vi–IV–I–V	F♯ major
"Anti-Hero"	Taylor Swift	2022	IV–I–V–vi	E major
"Any Way You Want It"	Journey	1980	I–V–vi–IV	G major
"Apologize"	Timbaland and OneRepublic	2007	vi–IV–I–V	C minor
"As If It's Your Last"	Blackpink	2017	IV−I−V−vi (chorus)	A♭ major (chorus)
"Audience of One"	Rise Against	2009	vi–IV–I–V (chorus)	C♯ major
"Awesome God"	Rich Mullins	2005	IV–I–V–vi	A major
"Bad Blood"	Taylor Swift	2014	IV–I–V–vi	G major
"Bailando"	Enrique Iglesias feat. Descemer Bueno and Gente de Zona	2014	vi–IV–I–V	E minor
"Be Like That"	3 Doors Down	2001	I–V–vi–IV	G major
"Beast of Burden"	The Rolling Stones	1978	I–V–vi–IV	E major
"Bebe"	6ix9ine	2018	vi–IV–I–V	A minor
"Behind These Hazel Eyes"	Kelly Clarkson	2005	vi–IV–I–V	A major
"Breakeven"	The Script	2008	IV–I–V–vi (chorus)	B♭ major/G minor
"Building a Mystery"	Sarah McLachlan	1997	vi–IV–I–V	B minor
"Bullet"	Hollywood Undead	2011	I–V–vi–IV	E major
"Bulletproof Picasso"	Train	2015	IV–I–V–vi	G major
"Burn"	Ellie Goulding	2013	vi–IV–I–V (pre-chorus and chorus)	B♭ minor/D♭ major
"California King Bed"	Rihanna	2011	I–V–vi–IV	G major
"Caramelldansen"	Caramell	2001	I–V–vi–IV	E♭ major/G♭ major
"Cheap Thrills"	Sia	2016	vi–IV–I–V	E minor
"City on Our Knees"	TobyMac	2009	I–V–vi–IV	C major
"Clean"	Taylor Swift	2014	I–V–vi–IV	E major
"Come Over"	Kenny Chesney	2012	vi–IV–I–V	B♭ minor
"Complicated"	Avril Lavigne	2002	vi–IV–I–V (intro)	D minor
"Cornelia Street"	Taylor Swift	2019	I–V–vi–IV	C major
"Cruise"	Florida Georgia Line	2012	I–V–vi–IV	B♭ major
"Daddy DJ"	Daddy DJ	1999	vi–IV–I–V	C minor
"Dammit"	Blink-182	1997	I–V–vi–IV	C major
"Demons"	Imagine Dragons	2013	I–V–vi–IV	E♭ major
"Despacito"	Luis Fonsi	2017	vi–IV–I–V	B minor
"Don't Trust Me"	3OH!3	2008	vi–IV–I–V	B♭ major
"Don't You Wanna Stay"	Jason Aldean and Kelly Clarkson	2010	vi–IV–I–V	G♯ minor
"Dosed"	Red Hot Chili Peppers	2003	I–V–vi–IV (chorus)	G major
"DotA"	Basshunter	2006	vi–IV–I–V	A minor
"Down"	Jay Sean feat. Lil Wayne	2009	IV–I–V–vi	D major
"Dragostea Din Tei"	O-Zone	2003	IV–I–V–vi; vi–IV–I–V	A minor
"Dream Catch Me"	Newton Faulkner	2007	I–V–vi–IV	D major
"Drive By"	Train	2012	vi–IV–I–V (verse) IV–I–V–vi (chorus)	C♯ minor
"Face Down"	The Red Jumpsuit Apparatus	2006	vi–IV–I–V	G minor
"Faded"	Alan Walker	2015	vi–IV–I–V	E♭ minor
"Feeling This"	Blink-182	2003	I–V–vi–IV	E major
"Flashlight"	Jessie J	2015	I–V–vi–IV	F major
"For the First Time"	The Script	2010	I–V–vi–IV	A major
"Forever Young"	Alphaville	1984	I–V–vi–IV	C major
"Fuckin' Perfect"	P!nk	2010	I–V–vi–IV	G major
"Ghost"	Justin Bieber	2021	vi–IV–I–V	D major
"Girls Like You"	Maroon 5	2018	I–V–vi–IV	C major
"Give Me Everything"	Pitbull feat. Ne-Yo, Afrojack, and Nayer	2011	vi–IV–I–V	E♭ major
"Glad You Exist"	Dan + Shay	2021	I–V–vi–IV	B major
"Glycerine"	Bush	1995	I–V–vi–IV	F major
"Good"	Better Than Ezra	1995	I–V–vi–IV	G major
"Gotta Be Somebody"	Nickelback	2008	I–V–vi–IV	C major
"Gotta Get Away"	The Offspring	1995	vi–IV–I–V	E minor
"Hair"	Lady Gaga	2011	I–V–vi–IV	F major
"Hall of Fame"	The Script feat. will.i.am	2012	vi–IV–I–V	G minor
"Happy Ending"	Mika	2007	I–V–vi–IV	D♭ major
"Heart Attack"	Demi Lovato	2013	IV–I–V–vi; vi–IV–I–V	F minor
"Hello"	Adele	2015	vi–IV–I–V (chorus)	F minor
"Hey Brother"	Avicii	2013	vi–IV–I–V	G minor
"Hide and Seek"	Imogen Heap	2005	I–V–vi–IV	A major
"High"	Lighthouse Family	1997	I–V–vi–IV	B♭ major
"Home"	Phillip Phillips	2012	IV–I–V–vi; vi–IV–I–V	C major
"How Do I Say Goodbye"	Dean Lewis	2022	IV–I–V–vi (chorus)	E♭ major
"How Far We've Come"	Matchbox Twenty	2007	I–V–vi–IV (verse) vi–IV–I–V (chorus)	C major
"Hwaa"	(G)I-dle	2021	vi−IV−I−V	F♯ minor
"I Don't Want To Be"	Gavin DeGraw	2003	IV–I–V–vi (chorus)	E♭ major
"If I Were a Boy"	Beyoncé	2008	vi–IV–I–V	G♭ major
"I Just Had Sex"	The Lonely Island feat. Akon	2010	vi–IV–I–V	D♯ minor
"I Love You"	EXID	2018	IV–I–V–vi (chorus)	C major
"I'm Goin' Down"	Bruce Springsteen	1985	I–V–vi–IV	B♭ major
"I'm Not Famous"	AJR	2016	V–vi–IV–I	F major
"I'm Yours"	Jason Mraz	2008	I–V–vi–IV	B major
"In My Head"	Jason Derulo	2009	vi–IV–I–V	C minor
"International Love"	Pitbull feat. Chris Brown	2011	vi–IV–I–V	C minor
"In the Blood"	Better Than Ezra	1995	V–vi–IV–I	C major
"In This River"	Black Label Society	2005	vi–IV–I–V	E minor
"I Want You to Want Me"	Cheap Trick	1977	I–V–vi–IV	A major
"I Was Here"	Beyoncé	2011	vi–IV–I–V	E minor
"Je marche seul"	Jean-Jacques Goldman	1985	I–V–vi–IV	D major (Chorus)
"Just a Dream"	Nelly	2010	vi–IV–I–V	E♭ minor
"Just the Way I'm Feeling"	Feeder	2003	V–vi–IV–I (chorus)	D major
"Kids"	OneRepublic	2016	V–vi–IV–I	D major
"Lemonade"	Alexandra Stan	2011	vi–IV–I–V	F♯ minor
"Little Talks"	Of Monsters and Men	2011	vi–IV–I–V	B♭ minor
"Love"	Lana Del Rey	2017	I–V–vi–IV (intro, verse, and chorus)	B♭ major
"Love Is On the Way"	Saigon Kick	1992	I–V–vi–IV	E major
"Love Me"	Justin Bieber	2009	vi–IV–I–V	C minor
"Love the Way You Lie"	Eminem feat. Rihanna	2010	vi–IV–I–V	G minor
"Machinehead"	Bush	1994	I–V–vi–IV	E major
"Marilyn Monroe"	Nicki Minaj	2012	vi–IV–I–V	E minor
"My Happy Ending"	Avril Lavigne	2004	vi–IV–I–V	B minor
"My Name Is Jonas"	Weezer	1994	I–V–vi–IV	B major
"Nobody's Perfect"	Hannah Montana (Miley Cyrus)	2007	vi–IV–I–V	C minor
"No One"	Alicia Keys	2007	I–V–vi–IV	E major
"No Woman, No Cry"	Bob Marley	1973	I–V–vi–IV	C♯ major
"Not Afraid"	Eminem	2010	vi–IV–I–V	C minor
"Nothing"	The Script	2010	I–V–vi–IV (chorus)	D major
"Numb"	Linkin Park	2003	vi–IV–I–V	F♯ minor
"OMG"	Candelita	2024	vi–IV–I–V	E major
"One Day"	Matisyahu	2008	I–V–vi–IV	C major
"One Last Breath"	Creed	2002	I–V–vi–IV	D major
"One of Us"	Joan Osborne	1995	vi–IV–I–V	F♯ minor
"On the Floor"	Jennifer Lopez feat. Pitbull	2011	vi–IV–I–V	E♭ minor
"Otherside"	Red Hot Chili Peppers	2000	vi–IV–I–V	A minor
"Out of the Woods"	Taylor Swift	2014	I–V–vi–IV	A minor
"Paparazzi"	Lady Gaga	2009	I–V–vi–IV	G major
"Part of the Band"	The 1975	2022	IV–I–V–vi (verse and outro)	F♯ major
"Peace of Mind"	Boston	1976	vi–IV–I–V	C♯ minor
"Perfect"	Ed Sheeran	2017	vi–IV–I–V (chorus)	A♭ major
"Pieces"	Sum 41	2005	vi–IV–I–V	D minor
"Poker Face"	Lady Gaga	2008	vi–IV–I–V	G♯ minor
"Pork and Beans"	Weezer	2008	I–V–vi–IV	G♭ major
"Prison Bound"	Social Distortion	1988	I–V–vi–IV	F♯ major
"Radio Nowhere"	Bruce Springsteen	2007	vi–IV–I–V	E minor
"Read All About It, Pt. III"	Emeli Sandé	2012	vi–IV–I–V	B minor
"Real World"	Matchbox Twenty	1998	I–V–vi–IV (verse)	B♭ major
"Replay"	Iyaz	2009	vi–IV–I–V	F♯ minor
"Rewrite the Stars"	Zac Efron and Zendaya	2018	vi–IV–I–V	B♭ major
"Rise"	McClain Sisters	2012	vi–IV–I–V	B minor
"River Flows in You"	Yiruma	2001	vi–IV–I–V	A major
"Rockstars"	Malik Harris	2022	I–V–vi–IV	G major
"Roly-Poly"	T-ARA	2011	vi–IV–I–V	A minor
"Runaway"	Kanye West	2010	I–V–vi–IV	E major
"San Francisco (Be Sure to Wear Flowers in Your Hair)"	Scott McKenzie	1967	vi–IV–I–V	E minor
"Save Tonight"	Eagle Eye Cherry	1997	vi–IV–I–V	C major
"Say Something"	A Great Big World	2013	vi–IV–I–V	B minor
"Scar"	Missy Higgins	2004	I–V–vi–IV	C major
"Self Esteem"	The Offspring	1994	vi–IV–I–V	A minor (verses); D minor (chorus)
"Shivers"	Ed Sheeran	2021	vi–IV–I–V	B minor
"Since You Been Gone"	Russ Ballard	1976	I–V–vi–IV	G major
"Singing in My Sleep"	Semisonic	1998	I–V–vi–IV	E major
"Six Degrees of Separation"	The Script	2012	vi–IV–I–V	C♯ minor
"Snow (Hey Oh)"	Red Hot Chili Peppers	2006	vi–IV–I–V	B major/G♯ minor
"So Far Away"	Staind	2003	vi–IV–I–V (verses), I–V–vi–IV (chorus)	G major
"Solo"	Iyaz	2010	I–V–vi–IV	B major
"Someone like You"	Adele	2011	I–V–vi–IV	A major
"Someone to You"	Banners	2017	I–V–vi–IV	D major
"Someone You Loved"	Lewis Capaldi	2018	I–V–vi–IV	D♭ major
"Soul To Squeeze"	Red Hot Chili Peppers	1993	I–V–vi–IV	F major
"Sparks Fly"	Taylor Swift	2011	vi–IV–I–V	D minor
"Stand"	Rascal Flatts	2007	vi–IV–I–V	A minor
"Stereo Hearts"	Gym Class Heroes	2011	vi–IV–I–V	A major
"Stick Season"	Noah Kahan	2022	I–V–vi–IV	A major
"Straight Through My Heart"	Backstreet Boys	2009	I–V–vi–IV (chorus)	D♯ major (chorus)
"Superclassico"	Ernia	2020	I–V–vi–IV	B major
"Stronger (What Doesn't Kill You)"	Kelly Clarkson	2012	vi–IV–I–V	A minor
"Stuck with Each Other"	Shontelle feat. Akon	2009	vi–IV–I–V (chorus)	B♭ major
"Take You Down"	Illenium	2018	vi–IV–I–V	B major
"Tangled Up in Me"	Skye Sweetnam	2004	I–V–vi–IV	C major
"The Days"	Avicii	2014	IV–I–V–vi (chorus)	C major
"The Edge of Glory"	Lady Gaga	2011	I–V–vi–IV	A major
"The Good Ones"	Gabby Barrett	2020	I–V–vi–IV	D major
"The Greatest"	Sia	2016	vi–IV–I–V	C major
"The Judge"	Twenty One Pilots	2015	IV–I–V–vi	C major
"The Kids Aren't Alright"	The Offspring	1999	vi–IV–I–V	B♭ minor
"The Rock Show"	Blink-182	2001	vi–IV–I–V (bridge)	A major/F♯ minor
"The Spectre"	Alan Walker	2017	vi–IV–I–V	C♯ minor
"(There's Gotta Be) More to Life"	Stacie Orrico	2003	vi–IV–I–V	F minor
"To Know Him Is to Love Him"	The Teddy Bears	1958	I–V–vi–IV	D major
"Treacherous"	Taylor Swift	2012	I–V–vi–IV	G major
"Try"	P!nk	2012	IV–I–V–vi; vi–IV–I–V	D major/B minor
"Tuesday's Gone"	Lynyrd Skynyrd	1973	I–V–vi–IV	A major
"Up"	Olly Murs feat. Demi Lovato	2014	IV−I−V−vi (chorus)	A major
"Wagon Wheel"	Old Crow Medicine Show and Bob Dylan	2004	I–V–vi–IV	A major
"Waka Waka (This Time for Africa)"	Shakira	2010	I–V–vi–IV	D major
"Wannabe"	Itzy	2020	IV–I–V–vi	F♯ minor/A major
"Wannabe"	Spice Girls	1996	V−vi−IV−I	B major
"We Are Never Ever Getting Back Together"	Taylor Swift	2012	IV–I–V–vi	G major
"We Can't Stop"	Miley Cyrus	2013	I–V–vi–IV	E major
"We Didn't Start the Fire"	Billy Joel	1989	I–V–vi–IV	G major
"We Found Love"	Rihanna feat. Calvin Harris	2011	vi–IV–I–V	F♯ major
"What About Now"	Lonestar	2000	I–V–vi–IV	E major
"Whatever"	Ava Max, Kygo	2024	vi–IV–I–V (chorus)	E♭ major
"Whatever It Takes"	Imagine Dragons	2017	IV–I–V–vi (chorus)	B♭ minor
"What Would I Change It To"	Avicii & AlunaGeorge	2017	I–V–vi–IV	B major
"What's My Age Again?"	Blink-182	1999	IV–I–V–vi; I–V–vi–IV	F♯ major
"When Can I See You Again?"	Owl City	2012	I–V–vi–IV	D major
"When I Come Around"	Green Day	1993	I–V–vi–IV	G♭ major
"Wherever You Will Go"	The Calling	2001	I–V–vi–IV	D major
"Where'd You Go"	Fort Minor feat. Holly Brook and Jonah Matranga	2006	I–V–vi–IV	E major
"Whistle"	Flo Rida	2012	vi–IV–I–V	A minor
"Who You Are"	Jessie J	2011	vi–IV–I–V	F♯ minor
"Willst du"	Alligatoah	2013	vi–IV–I–V	G♯ minor
"With Me"	Sum 41	2007	I–V–vi–IV (intro and verse)	E major
"With or Without You"	U2	1987	I–V–vi–IV	D major
"Wrecking Ball"	Miley Cyrus	2013	I–V–vi–IV (chorus)	F major
"Young Volcanoes"	Fall Out Boy	2013	vi–IV–I–V (verse)	B minor
"You Found Me"	The Fray	2008	vi–IV–I–V (chorus)	G♯ minor
"You'll Think Of Me"	Keith Urban	2004	I–V–vi–IV; vi–IV–I–V	A major/F♯ minor
"You're Not Sorry"	Taylor Swift	2008	vi–IV–I–V	E♭ minor
"Zombie"	The Cranberries	1994	vi–IV–I–V	E minor

== See also ==
- Roman numeral analysis
- "The Complexity of Songs"
- '50s progression
- IV^{△7}–V^{7}–iii^{7}–vi progression – the equivalent chord progression in contemporary Japanese music
