= Spirit (J-Rocks album) =

Studio album by J-Rocks
- Released: 2007
- Genre: Rock, hard rock, alternative rock, J-pop
- Label: Aquarius Musikindo

J-Rocks chronology
Topeng Sahabat (2005)	Spirit (2007)	Road to Abbey (2009)

Spirit is the second studio album by Indonesian rock band J-Rocks, released on 2007 in Indonesia by Aquarius Musikindo.

== Track listing ==
All tracks are written by J-Rocks.

No.	Title	Length
1.	"Cobalah Kau Mengerti"	3:54
2.	"Spirit"	3:41
3.	"Juwita Hati"	3:06
4.	"Tersesal"	4:30
5.	"Kau Curi Lagi (featuring Prisa)"	4:51
6.	"Saatnya Kau Bicara"	4:04
7.	"Mestinya Kau Tahu"	3:16
8.	"PDKT"	3:26
9.	"Aku Harus Bisa"	3:54
10.	"Semakin Sendiri"	4:39
