= Melangkah Di Atas Awan =

Indonesian musical fantasy television series

- Also known as: Melangkah Di Awan
- Genre: Romantic fantasy; Musical
- Screenplay by: Eddy D. Iskandar; Putu Wijaya
- Story by: Shanker RS
- Directed by: Putu Wijaya
- Starring: Inneke Koesherawati; Peggy Melati Sukma; Adji Massaid; Ronny Sianturi
- Theme music composer: Dwiki Darmawan
- Opening theme: "Melangkah Di Atas Awan"
- Composer: Dwiki Darmawan
- Country of origin: Indonesia
- Original language: Indonesian
- No. of seasons: 1
- No. of episodes: 19

Production
- Producers: Chand Parwez; Shanker RS
- Cinematography: Kokoq Priatmoko
- Editor: Teddy Setyadi
- Camera setup: Multi-camera
- Running time: 45 minutes
- Production company: Starvision

Original release
- Network: Indosiar
- Release: 11 September 1997 – 5 March 1998

Melangkah Di Atas Awan (lit. 'A walk in the clouds' or 'Walking in the clouds') is an Indonesian musical fantasy television series produced by Starvision. Directed by Putu Wijaya, who wrote the screenplay with Eddy D. Iskandar, the series mainly focuses on Indra, a college student who received his first paycheck and shared his feelings with his mother, Diah, while having a strong relationship with his wife Ayu, and his housekeeper Haryati. Overarching themes include a focus on love and relationships as well as the importance of socialization and humanity.

Starvision commissioned the series alongside its cast on 6 January 1997, after the success of Mutiara Cinta, Nikita, Mentari Di Balik Awan, and Harkat Wanita. The series was dedicated to actor and singer Ryan Hidayat, who died of typhus seven months before the premiere. It was first aired on Indosiar on 11 September 1997, and featured the commercially successful musical number "Melangkah Di Atas Awan", written by Eddy D. Iskandar and Putu Wijaya, composed and arranged by Dwiki Darmawan and performed by Ronny Sianturi, which received generally positive reviews and peaked at number 5 in Aneka Top 13 Indonesian Hits chart in November of that year. The series concluded on 5 March 1998, as a result of Sianturi's growing popularity and music career.

== Premise ==
=== Story ===
The series' main characters. From left to right: Sastro, Rita, Jaya, Maryam, Ayu, Indra and Asrul.

Indra is a newlywed college student who works in Harun's garage. When receiving first paycheck during his first job, he began to share his feelings with his mother, Diah. Diah's family prohibited Indra from entering the house from the front door and he decided to stop his mother's chores. Later Haryati offered Ayu, a girl who lives in the village to succeed Indra, then she fell in love with Jaya until Haryati forbids them and Jaya will instead have a crush on Rita, a sneaky, greedy girl.

After Haryati drove Ayu away, Rita began to call her boyfriend, Yudi, to succeed Ayu. Although Yudi knew Jaya, he refused Rita to cheat in her relationship because she did not want to insult Jaya. Ayu wanted to marry Indra after her recovery. They finally married at their house, and Indra's companies began to use Ayu's name.

When Mona invited Maryam to arrive at the dinner gala, her disease fared worse, while Asrul was forced to arrive. Asrul decided to break up with Mona, and called Jaya and Jaka are stepbrothers. At the cafe, Yudi became a singer, with Asrul, Rita, Sastro, and Tita stared at him while singing. Sastro decided that Yudi would become a successful singer because of his voice while he remembers Sastro became a successful record producer. Later, the relationship between Rita and Asrul is infidelity, resulting in Haryati being shocked when Rita returns home. At the hospital, Asrul apologized to Haryati and accused his problem.

After that, Jaya invited Danardi to live at his home, then abruptly met Ayu, who is pregnant. Indra did not report when he was busy during the grand opening of his garage. Meanwhile, Yudi signed a recording agreement at Sastro's record label. He notifies and invites Jaya to meet Sastro, who gave an example of a song titled "Melangkah Di Atas Awan" ("A walk in the clouds"), which Yudi finally sang and became the title track on his album. Ayu praised him when the song issued on the album cover reads "Lagu untuk Ayu" ("A song to Ayu") at the bottom. Maryam reported that Asrul and Rita would murder Jaya, although Haryati could not believe to find it.

=== Themes ===
The central conflict of the series is the disconnect between the public and personal lives of Indra, and the lengths to which he must go to secure his life as a normal student.

== Cast ==
=== Main ===
- Inneke Koesherawati as Rita, Danardi's daughter and Jaya's deceased wife. She dies after the office is on fire.
- Peggy Melati Sukma as Ayu, Diah's daughter-in-law and Indra's wife.
- Adji Massaid as Jaya, an aspiring lyricist
- Ronny Sianturi as Indra, a successful businessman and garage owner, married to Ayu.

=== Recurring ===
- Slamet Rahardjo as Sastro, a quirky musician who has poverty against Tita.
- Mieke Wijaya as Maryam, Asrul's mother and Haryati's former housewife
- Verrial as Mona, Yudi's girlfriend.
- Adipura as Asrul, a burglar who kidnaps Mona.
- Mien Brojo as Diah, Indra's mother.
- Rita Nasution as Tita, Sastro's wife.
- Torro Margens as Danardi, Rita's father and Sastro's songwriting friend.
- Dien Novita as Haryati, a businesswoman who was mad at Indra and Ayu.
- Ryan Hidayat as Jaka, Jaya's stepbrother. The series was released posthumously after Hidayat's death.
- Surya Saputra as Yudi, an aspiring singer in which Asrul and Rita praised his voice.

Additionally, Bella Saphira has been cast in an undisclosed role.

== Production ==
=== Development ===
Starvision officially greenlit the series in January 1997. The series was developed by Wijaya, who had previously directed Balada Dangdut for TPI.

Wijaya cited works like Baturraden, Cinderella and Inem Pelayan Seksi as particular influences when he enjoyed leaning into the romantic fantasy as a storytelling genre. The title itself a reference to the 1995 American film, A Walk in the Clouds.

=== Casting ===
The series and its primary cast were announced in January 1997; Slamet Rahardjo and Adipura would be portraying as the supporting characters of Sastro and Asrul respectively. Originally, actress Bella Saphira was also cast in the series. Rahardjo states that he was a fan of the director and was cast in the series, because Wijaya directed it.

This series was dedicated to actor Ryan Hidayat, who died because of typhus seven months before the release.

== Theme song ==
The main title theme for the series, "Melangkah Di Atas Awan", was composed and arranged by Dwiki Darmawan with lyrics written by Eddy D. Iskandar and Putu Wijaya, and performed by Ronny Sianturi. The theme song received generally positive reviews and peaked at number 5 in Aneka Top 13 Indonesian Hits, dated to 15 November 1997.

== Critical reception ==
Melangkah Di Atas Awan received generally positive reviews by critics, who praising its plot and characters.

== Cultural impact ==
Melangkah Di Atas Awan is subtly referenced in Mel Bakara's 2021 book, A Man Who Loves You.
