= Perawan Desa =

1980 film by Frank Rorimpandey

- Directed by: Frank Rorimpandey
- Written by: Putu Wijaya
- Produced by: Bucuk Suharto
- Starring: Yatti Surachman; Rae Sita; Maruli Sitompul; Soeroto; Mien Brodjo
- Cinematography: Harry Susanto
- Production company: PT Safari Sinar Sakti Film
- Release date: 1978
- Running time: 127 minutes
- Country: Indonesia
- Language: Indonesian language

Perawan Desa (Village Virgin) is a 1978 Indonesian drama film, directed by Frank Rorimpandey. The film won five awards, at the Indonesian Film Festival, of 1980.

== Accolades ==
Award	Year	Category	Recipient	Result
Indonesian Film Festival	1980	Best Feature Film		Won
Indonesian Film Festival	1980	Best Directing	Frank Rorimpandey	Won
Indonesian Film Festival	1980	Best Screenplay	Putu Wijaya	Won
Indonesian Film Festival	1980	Best Editing	Cassim Abbas	Won
Indonesian Film Festival	1980	Film With High Social Relevance		Won
Indonesian Film Festival	1980	Best Supporting Actor	Maruli Sitompul	Nominated
Indonesian Film Festival	1980	Best Female Actor Maid	Rae Sita	Nominated
