= Road to Abbey =

Road To Abbey

EP by J-Rocks
- Released: 2009
- Recorded: 2008, Abbey Road Studios
- Genre: Rock, hard rock, alternative rock, J-pop
- Label: Aquarius Musikindo

J-Rocks chronology
Spirit (2007)	Road To Abbey (2009)	J-Rocks Nescafé Journey (2013)

Road to Abbey is the first EP by Indonesian rock band J-Rocks released in 2009. It was recorded at the famous Abbey Road Studios in the United Kingdom. This album marked J-Rocks as the first Indonesian band ever to record there.

== Track listing ==
All tracks are written by J-Rocks.

No.	Title	Length
1.	"Road to Abbey"	4:38
2.	"Fallin' in Love (Indonesian Version)"	4:14
3.	"Hanya Aku"	4:06
4.	"Meraih Mimpi"	3:16
5.	"Fallin' in Love (English Version)"	4:12
