= J-Roc (disambiguation) =

J-Roc is a hip hop and R&B music producer.

J-Roc may also refer to:

- J-Roc, a character from the Canadian television series Trailer Park Boys
- J Rocc, founder of American DJ collective Beat Junkies
- JROC, Joint Requirements Oversight Council

== See also ==
- J-Rock (disambiguation)
