= 2009 Dahsyatnya Awards =

Indonesian music awards ceremony in 2009

- Date: April 19, 2009
- Location: Ancol Dome Carnaval Beach, Pademangan, North Jakarta
- Hosted by: Luna Maya; Raffi Ahmad; Olga Syahputra

Highlights
- Most awards: Peterpan (2)
- Most nominations: D'Masiv (4); Nidji (4)

Television/radio coverage
- Network: RCTI

The 2009 Dahsyatnya Awards was an awards show for Indonesian musicians. It was the first annual show. The show was held on April 19, 2009, at the Ancol Dome Carnaval Beach in Pademangan, North Jakarta. The awards show was hosted by Luna Maya, Raffi Ahmad, and Olga Syahputra.

D'Masiv and Nidji led the nominations with four categories, followed by Peterpan, Project Pop and The Changcuters with three nominations. Peterpan was the biggest winner of the night, taking home two awards for Outstanding Band and Outstanding Video Clip for "Walau Habis Terang".

== Winners and nominees ==
Winners are listed first and highlighted on boldface.

=== SMS ===
Outstanding Song	Outstanding Newcomer
**"Cinta Ini Membunuhku" — D'Masiv**; "Aku Pasti Kembali" — Pasto; "Bukan Superstar" — Project Pop; "Kisah Cintaku" — Peterpan; "Laskar Pelangi" — Nidji; "Masih Ada" — Ello; "P.U.S.P.A" — ST 12	**Hijau Daun**; Alexa; Aura Kasih; Hello; Lyla; Sind3ntosca; Vidi Aldiano
Outstanding Solo Singer	Outstanding Duo/Group Singer
**Agnes Monica**; Afgan; Anggun; Bunga Citra Lestari; Ello; Mulan Jameela; Rossa	**Maia**; BBB; Mahadewi; Pasto; Project Pop; RAN; T2
Outstanding Band	Outstanding Stage Act
**Peterpan**; D'Masiv; Kangen Band; Nidji; The Changcuters; Ungu	**The Changcuters**; D'Masiv; J-Rocks; Kotak; Nidji; Project Pop
Outstanding non-Singer Guest Star	Outstanding Location
**Hillary Clinton**; Ibrahim Khalil Alkatiri; Dude Harlino; Fauzi Bowo; Joe Sandy	**Ramayana Mall, Denpasar, Bali**; Botani Square, Bogor, West Java; ITC Cempaka Emas, Kemayoran, Central Jakarta; Paris Van Java, Bandung, West Java; WTC Mangga Dua, North Jakarta

=== Jury ===
Outstanding Video Clip	Outstanding Role in Video Clip
**"Walau Habis Terang" — Peterpan**; "Cinta Ini Membunuhku" — D'Masiv; "Malaikat Juga Tahu" — Dewi Lestari; "Laskar Pelangi" — Nidji; "Selalu Mengalah" — Seventeen; "Hijrah Ke London" — The Changcuters	**Lukman Sardi — "Malaikat Juga Tahu" (performed by Dewi Lestari)**; Agnes Monica — "Godai Aku Lagi" (performed by Agnes Monica); Ariel — "Walau Habis Terang" (performed by Peterpan); Sammy Simorangkir — "Bila Rasamu Ini Rasaku" (performed by Kerispatih); Tyas Mirasih — "Selalu Mengalah" (performed by Seventeen)
Outstanding Most Commit Guest Star
**Nineball**; Alexa; Kotak; Lyla; Marvells; Seventeen
