= Topeng Sahabat =

Studio album by J-Rocks
- Released: 2005
- Genre: Rock, alternative rock
- Label: Aquarius Musikindo

J-Rocks chronology
Topeng Sahabat (2005)	Spirit (2007)

Topeng Sahabat is the debut studio album by Indonesian rock band J-Rocks, released on 2005 in Indonesia by Aquarius Musikindo.

== Track listing ==
All tracks are written by J-Rocks.

No.	Title	Length
1.	"Lepaskan Diriku"	3:57
2.	"Kuingin Kau Untukku"	4:22
3.	"Entah Bagaimana"	3:25
4.	"Into The Silent"	3:00
5.	"Topeng Sahabat"	4:53
6.	"Ceria"	3:53
7.	"Cahaya-Mu"	4:27
8.	"Berharap Kau Kembali"	4:31
9.	"Selamat Tinggal Kekasihku"	4:01
10.	"Mestinya Kuakhiri Semua"	3:45
11.	"Kono Mune Ni"	4:30
