= Ronnie Sianturi =

Indonesian singer and actor (born 1965)

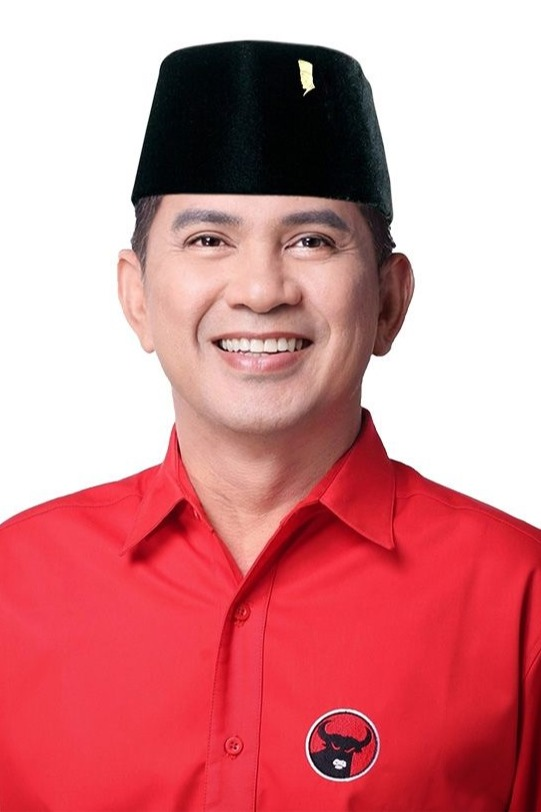
- Born: Ronaldus Parasian Sianturi; September 3, 1965 (age 60); Makassar, South Sulawesi, Indonesia
- Education: SMA Negeri 15 Jakarta
- Occupations: Singer; actor
- Years active: 1983–present
- Known for: "Melangkah Di Awan"
- Political party: Indonesian Democratic Party of Struggle (2019–present)
- Spouse: Atiek CB (divorced)
- Partner: Peggy Melati Sukma (1997-1998)
- Musical career
- Genres: Bubblegum pop; teen pop; show tune
- Instrument: Vocals
- Label: Musica
- Member of: Libels

Ronaldus Parasian "Ronnie" Sianturi (born September 3, 1965) is an Indonesian singer and actor. He is the founding member of the Indonesian male trio Libels, formed in 1983. Outside of his career with Libels, he is known for singing "Melangkah Di Awan", written and composed by Dwiki Dharmawan and Eddy D. Iskandar and released in 1997.

== Life and career ==
=== 1983-2001: Debut with Libels and Melangkah Di Atas Awan ===
Sianturi debuted in 1983 with the formation of the male vocal trio Libels when he was in high school. The trio won the first place for group category at Indonesian Youth Radio and Television Star of 1983. Libels made their studio debut in 1989 with the album Gadisku. From 1994 to 2001, he joined Piramida game show as the host. He began his television acting debut and portrays as Willy in Mentari Di Balik Awan (Moonlight Behind the Clouds) in 1996, with Ayu Azhari portraying as Nina. In 1997, Sianturi starred as Indra in the TV series Melangkah Di Atas Awan (Walking in the Clouds). The series' theme song, titled "Melangkah Di Awan", received generally positive reviews and peaked at number five in Aneka Top 13 Hits Indonesia, dated to November 15, 1997.

In 2000, Sianturi signed a contract with Sony Music Indonesia, to release his self-titled album, Ronnie, in April of that year. It did not enjoy the same popularity or critical success as "Melangkah Di Awan". A year later, Sianturi returned to Musica to release his special studio album, Bintang Keabadian (Eternal Star).

== Personal life ==
Sianturi was once married to fellow singer Atiek CB in 1988, and divorced without any children five years later.

== Filmography ==
=== Television ===
Year	Title	Role	Notes
1994	Piramida	Presenter	
1996—1997	Si Doel Anak Sekolahan	Anto	Season 3
1996	Mentari Di Balik Awan	Willy	Miniseries
1997	Saat Aku Mencintaimu	Jodi	Miniseries
1997	Kebetulan Sekali		
1997—1998	Romi dan Yuli: A Love Story	—N/a	As theme music composer
1997—1998	Melangkah Di Atas Awan	Indra	Miniseries
1997—1998	Serpihan Mutiara Retak	Arfian	
1998	Serat-Serat Kehidupan	Rudy	
2000	Merah, Hitam Cinta	—N/a	As theme song performer
2001	Andini: Demi Cinta	Tony	
2003	Satu Lelaki dan Tiga Hantu Cantik	Adam	Television film
2006	OB (Office Boy)	Watchman	
2007	OB (Office Boy)	Himself	

== Discography ==
- Sudikah Kamu? (1994)
- Ronnie (2000)
- Bintang Keabadian (2001)

== Live performances ==
Date	Program/Concert	Performed song(s)	Ref.
January 18, 1998	Pesta	"Melangkah Di Atas Awan"	
August 5, 2023	Musik Eraku	"Harus Malam Ini", "Cintaku" (with Atiek CB, Ita Purnamasari and Mayangsari), "Melangkah Di Atas Awan", "Aku Suka Kamu", "Sudikah Kamu", "Salahkah Aku Terlalu Mencintaimu"	

== Accolades ==
Year	Award	Category	Work(s)	Result	Ref.
1998	Indonesian Soap-Opera Festival	Best Lead Actor in a Drama	Serpihan Mutiara Retak	Nominated	
