= J-Rocks =

Indonesian Rock Band

- Origin: Jakarta, Indonesia
- Genres: Alternative rock; pop rock; J-pop; J-rock; hard rock; heavy metal; alternative metal
- Years active: 2002–present
- Label: Aquarius Musikindo
- Members: Iman Taufik Rachman; Sony Ismail Robbayani; Swara Wimayoga; Anton Rudi Kelces
- Website: j-rocks.co.id

J-Rocks is an Indonesian rock band formed in 2002. It consists of Iman (lead vocals, rhythm guitar), Sony (lead guitar), Wima (bass guitar) and Anton (drums). Their music is heavily influenced by Japanese rock bands (especially L'Arc-en-Ciel). J-Rocks fans are called J-Rockstars.

The band's name, "J-Rocks", comes from "J" representing their origin, Jakarta; and "Rockstar" because they wanted their fans to be called “Rockstars”.

== History ==
In 2004, J-Rocks won in a Jakarta music competition Nescafe Get Started, sponsored by record label Aquarius Musikindo. Their victory enabled them to contribute in a compilation album, Nescafe Get Started. The label released their debut album, Topeng Sahabat, in 2005. They contributed two songs on the soundtrack album of the motion picture Dealova: "Serba Salah" and "Into The Silent".

The band started to gain popularity since their second album, Spirit, in 2007. They played a variety of musical styles in the album, including: rock 'n roll, waltz, symphonic metal, blues, classical music, and others. In the single "Kau Curi Lagi", they collaborated with a female guitarist, Prisa Rianzi. They also made a music video in Japan for the single "Juwita Hati". It was handled by music video director Hedy Suryawan. Some regions in Japan, including Shibuya and Harajuku were used as the shooting location. That music video has increased J-Rocks' popularity quite significantly in Indonesia.

=== Abbey Road Studios ===
J-Rocks were the first Indonesian band to record at Abbey Road Studios in the United Kingdom. From 12 to 16 October 2008, they recorded and mixed songs with sound engineer Chris Butler. The result was their five-song EP, Road to Abbey, released in 2009. The album cover portrayed band members crossing Abbey Road's zebra cross, imitating The Beatles' 1969 album Abbey Road.

== Band members ==
- Iman Taufik Rachman — lead vocals, guitar, keyboards (2003–present)
- Sony Ismail Robayani — guitar, backing vocals (2003–present)
- Swara Wimayoga — bass, backing vocals (2003–present)
- Anton Rudi Kelces — drums, percussion, occasional backing vocals (2003–present)

== Discography ==
=== Studio albums ===
Title	Album details	Sales	Certifications
Topeng Sahabat	Released: May 16, 2005; Label: Aquarius Musikindo; Formats: CD, digital download	900,000+	ASIRI: 6× Platinum
Spirit	Released: July 1, 2007; Label: Aquarius Musikindo; Formats: CD, digital download	900,000+	ASIRI: 6× Platinum
Journey	Released: May 7, 2013; Label: Aquarius Musikindo; Formats: CD, digital download	—N/a	—N/a
Let's Go!	Released: October 20, 2017; Label: Aquarius Musikindo; Formats: CD, digital download	—N/a	—N/a

=== EPs ===
Title	Album details	Sales	Certifications
Road To Abbey	Released: March 23, 2009; Label: Aquarius Musikindo; Formats: CD, digital download	75,000+	ASIRI: Platinum

== Awards and nominations ==
Year	Award	Category	Work/Nominee	Result	Ref.
2008	MTV Indonesia Awards	Best Cutting Edge Artist	J-Rocks	Nominated	
2009	MTV Indonesia Awards	Most Favorite Band/Group/Duo	"Fallin' in Love"	Nominated	
2009	Dahsyatnya Awards	Outstanding Stage Act	J-Rocks	Nominated	
2010	Indonesian Music Awards	Best Rock Duo/Group Solo Artist	"Fallin' in Love"	Won	
2010	Indonesian Music Awards	Best Rock Album	Road To Abbey	Nominated	
2010	Dahsyatnya Awards	Outstanding Stage Act	J-Rocks	Nominated	
2011	Indonesian Music Awards	Best Rock Duo/Group Solo Artist	"Madu dan Racun"	Nominated	
2011	Dahsyatnya Awards	Outstanding Stage Act	J-Rocks	Won	
