= Putu Wijaya =

Indonesian writer

- Born: April 11, 1944 (age 82); Tabanan, Bali
- Writing career
- Language: Indonesian
- Genres: Fiction, Drama, Poetry
- Notable work: Telegram (novel)

I Gusti Ngurah Putu Wijaya (born April 11, 1944) is an Indonesian author, considered by many to be one of Indonesia's most prominent literary figures. His output is impressive; his published works include more than thirty novels, forty dramas, a hundred short stories, and thousands of essays, articles, screenplays and television dramas, and he has been the recipient of a number of literary prizes.

== Biography ==
=== Early life ===
Wijaya is the youngest of eight siblings (three of them from a different father). He lived in a large housing complex with around 200 people who were all members of the same extended family, and were accustomed to reading. His interest in literature came not from his immediate family but his extended family, and as a primary school student, he read classics like Anton Chekhov and William Shakespeare. His father, I Gusti Ngurah Raka, was hoping for him to become a doctor, but he was weak in the natural sciences. He liked history, language and geography. As a child, he used to sneak out to see traditional dance dramas or wayang. But it wasn't until high school, when he participated in a performance of Anton Chekhov's The Bear, that his love for theater began.

Not long after he finished junior high school his first works were published in Suluh Indonesia, and several years later his works appeared in the "Fajar" (Dawn) column of Mimbar Indonesia (Indonesian Pulpit) magazine. Within five years his essays and stories were being published in Minggu Pagi (Sunday Morning) and Majalah Djawa (Java Magazine).

After graduating from high school, he continued his tertiary education in Yogyakarta, studying at the Indonesian Fine Arts Academy and the Drama and Film Arts Academy, before graduating with a law degree from Gadjah Mada University. While in Yogyakarta, he became involved in theater and performed in several theater groups including Bengkel Teater and Sanggar Bambu. In 1969, his play Lautan Bernyanyi (Chanting ocean) was awarded third place in a drama-writing contest organized by the Indonesian National Theater Development Agency.

From Yogyakarta, Wijaya moved to Jakarta where he launched his literary career while working as a journalist for Tempo and Zaman. He retained his interest in theater and, soon after arriving in Jakarta, joined Teater Kecil and Teater Populer.

=== Later career ===
Since 1971 he has led the Teater Mandiri, widely regarded as Indonesia's foremost theater collective, where his philosophy of creating a tontonan (spectacle) helps to establish a dialogue between author and audience. The first of his plays staged by Teater Mandiri was Aduh, which was presented at the Taman Ismail Marzuki performing arts center in 1973. Written in 1972, the play tells the story of how a group of people react to the intrusion of a stranger into their lives. The stranger is dying but instead of helping him they keep questioning him and arguing among themselves until, finally, he dies. In 2011, as part of its 40th anniversary celebration, Aduh was included in a trilogy staged by the Teater Mandiri. Presented under the title Trik (The Trick), the three plays are all among his well-known works: Apakah kita sudah merdeka? (Are we free yet?), Aduh and Setan (Devil). In 2010, his works took center stage when 28 of his monologues and four of his drama pieces were presented at the second Indonesian Theater Forum in Solo (Surakarta), Central Java.

His short stories often appear in the columns of the daily newspapers Kompas and Sinar Harapan, and he has been called "The Father of Short Stories". His novels are also often published in the magazines Kartini, Femina and Horison. As a script writer, he has twice won the Citra Award at the Indonesian Film Festival, for the movies Perawan Desa (1980) and Kembang Kertas (1985). He has also received recognition outside Indonesia as well. This has included fellowships to study kabuki in Japan, a residency at the University of Iowa's International Writing Program, and a Fulbright Scholarship to teach Indonesian theater at universities in the United States. His play Gerr was translated into English as GEEZ! and Aum translated as Roar. They were staged in Madison, Wisconsin and the production of Roar was brought to the La MaMa Experimental Theatre Club in New York City. His writing has been translated into Japanese, Arabic and Thai as well as English.

He continues to be a prominent figure in the promotion of Indonesian literature and culture. In 2011 he participated in the launch of the Lontar Foundation's Modern Library of Indonesia, a series of Indonesian novels translated into English. His novel Telegram was one of the first ten novels to be included in the series, and marks the first time this novel has been translated into English.

== Selected works ==
Short stories

- Gres, Jakarta: Balai Pustaka, 1982
- Blok, Jakarta: Pustaka Firdaus, 1994
- Darah, Jakarta: Balai Pustaka, 1995
- Zig Zag, Jakarta: Pustaka Firdaus, 1996
- Tidak, Jakarta: Pabelan Jayakarta, 1999

Drama

- Dar-Der-Dor, Jakarta: Grasindo, 1996

Novels

- Bila Malam Bertambah Malam, Jakarta: Pustaka Jaya, 1971
- Telegram, Jakarta: Pustaka Jaya, 1973
- MS, Jakarta, 1975
- Ratu, Jakarta, 1977
- Sah, Jakarta, 1977
- Stasiun, Jakarta, Pustaka Jaya, 1977
- Tak Cukup Sedih, Jakarta, 1977
- Keok, Jakarta: Pustaka Jaya, 1978
- Sobat, Jakarta: Sinar Harapan, 1981
- Lho, Jakarta: Balai Pustaka, 1982
- Nyali, Jakarta: Balai Pustaka, 1983
- Dor, Jakarta: Balai Pustaka, 1986
- Pol, Jakarta: Gramedia, 1987
- Teror, Jakarta: Pustaka Jaya, 1991
- Kroco, Jakarta: Pustaka Firdaus, 1995
- Byar Pet, Jakarta: Pustaka Firdaus, 1995
- Aus, Jakarta: Grasindo, 1996
- Tetralogi Dangdut: Nora (1st book), Mala (2nd book) 2008

Poetry

- Dadaku adalah Perisaiku, Denpasar: Lesiba, 1974

Television

- Melangkah Di Atas Awan (1997, co-written with Eddy D. Iskandar)

== Bibliography ==
- Ellen Rafferty, ed. Putu Wijaya in Performance: A Script and Study in Indonesian Theatre. Madison: University of Wisconsin Press, 2004. ISBN 1-881261-34-4
