= List of Dengan Menyebut Nama Allah cover versions =

The song "Dengan Menyebut Nama Allah", written by Ags. Arya Dipayana and Dwiki Dharmawan, and originally recorded by Novia Kolopaking for the album of the same name, has been covered by many different artists.

== List ==
| Year | Artist(s) | Notes |
|---|---|---|
| 1995 | Oki Oktaviani | Regret soundtrack album |
| 1996 | Rita Effendy and Agus Wisman | From Rita's third studio album Semesta Tuhan. |
| 1996 | Dwiki Dharmawan Orchestra | From Ita Purnamasari's special studio album KepadaMu Ya Allah/Dalam Sujudku |
| 1997 | Dewi Gita | Twilite Orchestra's Idul Fitri concert |
| 1997 | Ita Purnamasari | see section |
| 1998 | Warna | |
| 2002 | Ikke Nurjanah | From her 2002 album, Lebaran Bersama Ikke Nurjanah. |
| 2003 | Gita Swara Nassa – Junior Choir | From the choir's 2003 album Renungan. |
| 2004 | Gigi | see section |
| 2007 | Marshanda | Soleha soundtrack album |
| 2011 | Rida RSD | From her 2011 album Dengan Menyebut Nama Allah. |
| 2014 | Lana Nitibaskara | From the 2014 compilation album Collaborating Harmony: Dwiki Dharmawan |
| 2015 | Raisa | 2015 Ramadan Jazz Festival |
| 2017 | Andini | |
| 2017 | Purwa Caraka Music Studio Choir | Surat Kecil untuk Tuhan soundtrack album |
| 2017 | Vega Darwanti and Vicky Prasetyo | |
| 2018 | Tyara Rafanaura | The Voice Kids Indonesia season 3 grand final |
| 2019 | Nagita Slavina | |
| 2019 | Lesti Kejora | Lazada Simfoni Ramadan concert |
| 2019 | Potret | 2019 Jakarta Muharram Festival |
| 2020 | Various Indonesian dangdut artists | Satu Indonesia charity concert |
| 2021 | Nathalie Holscher | |
| 2024 | Écoutez | Day 1 of 2024 Ramadan Jazz Festival |
| 2024 | Dwiki Dharmawan and Friends featuring Iwan Abdie | Day 2 of 2024 Ramadan Jazz Festival |
| 2025 | Jinan Laetitia | see section |
| 2025 | Erwin Gutawa Orchestra | Symphonesia: Ngabuburit concert |

== Ita Purnamasari versions ==
"Dengan Menyebut Nama Allah"

Song by Ita Purnamasari
- Released: 1997
- Length: 6:10
- Label: HP
- Composer: Dwiki Dharmawan
- Lyricist: Ags. Arya Dipayana
- Producer: Dwiki Dharmawan

Music video
- "Dengan Menyebut Nama Allah" by Ita Purnamasari on YouTube

"Dengan Menyebut Nama Allah" was covered in 1997 by Indonesian singer-songwriter Ita Purnamasari, whose husband Dwiki Dharmawan wrote and arranged the original version in 1992. Before marrying to Dwiki in 1995, Ita loved the song when she had previously performed it on Ramadan events.

"Dengan Menyebut Nama Allah" was re-recorded by Ita on her second special album Spiritual Journey, released on 18 June 2015.

=== Live performances ===
On 6 January 1997, Ita performed "Dengan Menyebut Nama Allah" during Harmoko's awarding ceremony, held by Republika. She performed it again during the eighty-eighth episode of Pentas Sejuta Aksi, on 18 January 1998.

== Gigi version ==
"Dengan Menyebut Nama Allah"

Song by Gigi

from the album Raihlah Kemenangan
- Released: 19 October 2004
- Recorded: 2004
- Studio: Temple Island
- Genre: Acoustic rock
- Length: 4:46
- Label: Sony BMG
- Songwriter: Dwiki Dharmawan
- Producer: Gigi

Licensed audio
- "Dengan Menyebut Nama Allah" by Gigi on YouTube

In 2004, Indonesian band Gigi covered the song in an acoustic rock version, taken from the album Raihlah Kemenangan. While the original version recorded in the key of A-flat major with a tempo of 76 beats per minute, their version set in a time signature of 3/4 and recorded in the key of E major, with a tempo of 174 beats per minute. Their version also became the theme song for the similarly-named reality television program which aired in 2005.

=== Live performances and promotion ===
Gigi promoted the album with a series of live performances on Indonesian concert tours. It became the set list of the band's Ngabuburit Tour. In 2008, the band performed the song at Pintu SurgaMu, a collaborative concert between Gigi and Ungu.

=== Personnel ===
Personnel adapted from album's liner notes.

Studio

- Recorded at Temple Island Studio
- Mixed and mastered at Slingshot Studio

Personnel

- Gigi – production
  - Armand Maulana – vocals
  - Dewa Budjana – guitar
  - Thomas Ramdhan – bass
  - Gusti Hendy – drums

Production

- Stephan Santoso – mixing, mastering

== Dwiki Dharmawan and Jinan Laetitia version ==
"Dengan Menyebut Nama Allah"

Single by Dwiki Dharmawan and Jinan Laetitia
- Released: 28 February 2025
- Genre: Orchestral pop; contemporary R&B
- Length: 4:12
- Label: Warner Indonesia
- Songwriters: Dwiki Dharmawan; Ags. Arya Dipayana
- Producers: Dwiki Dharmawan; Jinan Laetitia

Jinan Laetitia singles chronology
| "Visions (from Under the Rubble)" (2024) | "Dengan Menyebut Nama Allah" (2025) | "Hanya Memuji" (2025) |

Music video
- "Dengan Menyebut Nama Allah" by Dwiki Dharmawan and Jinan Laetitia on YouTube

In 2025, Dwiki performed a cover of "Dengan Menyebut Nama Allah" in a version with Indonesian singer Jinan Laetitia. This version combines aspects of orchestral music and contemporary R&B genre. It was released on 28 February 2025, along with an accompanying music video produced and directed by Andika Bayu. Their version was nominated for Best Islamic Music Production Work at the 28th Annual Anugerah Musik Indonesia.

=== Personnel ===
Credits adapted from Apple Music.

Personnel

- Dwiki Dharmawan – songwriting, orchestration, arrangement, production
- Ags. Arya Dipayana – songwriting
- Jinan Laetitia – vocals, synths, production
- Sarah Fadila – synths
- Mohammed Kamga – vocal director
- Czech Symphony Orchestra – orchestra
- Osvaldorio – mixing, mastering
