= Mpok Nori =

Indonesian comedian and actress

- Born: Nuri Sarinuri; 10 August 1930; Batavia, Dutch East Indies
- Died: 3 April 2015 (aged 84); Jakarta, Indonesia

Comedy career
- Years active: 1980–2015

Nuri Sarinuri binti Kenan (better known as Mpok Nori; 10 August 1930 – 3 April 2015) was an Indonesian comedian and actress.

== Career ==
She began her career as an actress along with her friend Hj. Muhammad Bokir.

== Personal life ==
In 1946, she married. She would have six children. On 3 April 2015, she died in Pasar Rebo General Hospital, East Jakarta, aged 84.

== Filmography ==
- Hantu Biang Kerok (2009)
- Get Married 2 (2009)
- Get Married 3 (2011)
- Pocong Mandi Goyang Pinggul (2011)
- Penganten Pocong (2012)
- Jeritan Danau Terlarang (2013)
- Sule Detektif Tokek (2013)
- Malam Suro di Rumah Darmo (2014)
