= Semesta Mendukung =

- Promotional poster
- Directed by: John De Rantau
- Written by: Hendrawan Wahyudianto; John De Rantau
- Produced by: Putut Widjanarko
- Starring: Revalina S. Temat; Lukman Sardi; Helmalia Putri; Indro; Sujiwo Tejo; Dinda Hauw; Sayef Muhammad Billah; Angga Putra; Rendy Ahmad
- Distributed by: Mizan Productions & Falcon Pictures
- Release date: 20 October 2011
- Running time: 101 minutes
- Country: Indonesia
- Language: Indonesian

Semesta Mendukung (The Universe Supports), often abbreviated Mestakung, is a 2011 Indonesian family film directed by John de Rantau. It follows a young Madurese boy as he searches for his mother through the International Physics Olympiad.

== Plot ==
Muhammad Arief (Sayef Muhammad Billah), the son of poor family in Sumenep, Madura Island, greatly enjoys science, especially physics. His father, Muslat (Lukman Sardi), is a former salt farmer who became a driver after an economic downturn. His mother, Salmah (Helmalia Putri), has gone abroad in search of work; the family have not heard from her, and Arief misses her. Although it is difficult due to his economic situation, Arief studies physics diligently.

Arief's physics teacher Tari Hayat (Revalina S. Temat), seeing potential in him after Arief retrieves a ball from a tree with a rocket, suggests that he participate in the International Physics Olympiad in Singapore. Arief agrees, but his main goal is to find his mother. After the selection process in Jakarta, Arief goes to the Olympiad with fellow would-be-physicists Muhammad Thamrin (Angga Putra) and Clara Annabela (Dinda Hauw).

After arriving in Singapore, the Indonesian team wins several matches. However, just before the finals Arief discovers that his mother is to leave for Malaysia. Although at first he decides to rush to the port to stop her, he is convinced to stay with the Olympiad team, who win the competition. Arief then stops his mother from going to Malaysia, and the two return to Madura.

== Production ==
Mestakung was directed by John de Rantau, best known for the Academy Award-submitted Denias Senandung Di Atas Awan (Denias, Singing on the Cloud; 2006) and Obama Anak Menteng (Obama, Child of Menteng(2009). It was written by Hendrawan Wahyudianto and de Rantau; production was handled by Mizan Production and Falcon Picture, with Putut Widjanarko serving as producer.

Mestakung's title was derived the philosophy of physicist Yohanes Surya, who had trained Indonesia's International Physics Olympiad team; Surya taught that, when a person needed to succeed at his or her goals, the universe would work to support person. He called this semesta mendukung, which means the universe supports. The events in the film are based on a true story, which occurred to the 2006 Indonesian Physics Olympiad team.

Numerous Indonesian actors were chosen for roles, including Laura Basuki, who had won a Citra Award at the 2010 Indonesian Film Festival. Surya had a cameo in the film. Shooting took place over three weeks in Madura and Singapore.

Mestakung's soundtrack was mostly handled by the Indonesian band Goliath. Initially asked to record a single song, the band recorded three within a month, which were accepted by the film's producers. However, a traditional Madurese song was included, as was the song "Indonesia", as sung by Powerslaves.

== Release and reception ==
Mestakung, initially scheduled for an August release, premiered on 18 October 2011 at XXI Gandaria City, South Jakarta; wide release followed on 20 October. Triwik Kurniasari, writing for The Jakarta Post, wrote that the film had inspirational ideas but suffered due to poor acting by Billah.
