= Menikahi Jadi yang Kedua =

- Genre: Drama; Romantic
- Directed by: Viva Westi
- Starring: Aisyah Aqilah; Nino Fernandez; Carissa Perusset; Fendy Chow; Bertrand Antolin; Pierre Gruno
- Country of origin: Indonesia
- Original language: Indonesian
- No. of seasons: 1
- No. of episodes: 6

Production
- Executive producers: Jeff Han; Juan Xiang; Febriamy Hutapea
- Producer: Sridhar Jetty
- Cinematography: Rico Manuel
- Editor: Iska Sutardi
- Camera setup: Multi-camera
- Running time: 40 minutes
- Production company: Ess Jay Studios

Original release
- Network: WeTV
- Release: 14 November – 21 December 2025

Menikahi Jadi yang Kedua is an Indonesian television series which aired on 14 November 2025 on WeTV. Produced by Ess Jay Studios and starring Aisyah Aqilah, Nino Fernandez, dan Carissa Perusset.

== Plot ==
Nayra, an employee who serves as the backbone of her family, is burdened by a serious illness. One day, her burden increases when her mother is diagnosed with a terminal illness and requires expensive treatment.

Her diligence at work attracts the attention of the billionaire couple who own the company where she works, Kenzo and Angel. Angel, Kenzo's wife, then asks Nayra to become his second wife. This is because Angel is unable to bear Kenzo children.

As the second wife, Nayra is placed in a secret luxury mansion unknown to everyone, including Adrian and Lusiana, Kenzo's parents. Despite being a concubine, Nayra and Kenzo slowly begin to develop feelings of love.

Confused by her feelings, Nayra meets Dimitri, a new employee. Dimitri's seemingly sincere concern for her begins to leave Nayra in a dilemma. Meanwhile, a major secret will shake the relationships between Angel, Kenzo, Nayra, and Dimitri.

== Cast ==
- Aisyah Aqilah as Nayra
- Nino Fernandez as Kenzo
- Carissa Perusset as Angel
- Fendy Chow as Dimitri
- Michelle Joan as Fani
- Diah Permatasari as Lusiana
- Bertrand Antolin as Jojo
- Willem Bevers as Adrian
- Dian Nitami as Ratna
- Pierre Gruno as Opa
- Giulio Parengkuan as Mario
- Angga Putra as Jimmy
- Juna as Kai
