= Algojo (TV series) =

- Genre: Action; Drama
- Written by: Ilya Aktop; Nicholas Raven; Ami Murti
- Directed by: Rahabi Mandra
- Starring: Arya Saloka; Caitlin Halderman; Randy Pangalila
- Country of origin: Indonesia
- Original language: Indonesian
- No. of seasons: 1
- No. of episodes: 8

Production
- Executive producers: Sutanto Hartono; Mark Francis; Anthony Buncio
- Producer: Wicky V. Olindo
- Production company: Screenplay Films

Original release
- Network: Vidio
- Release: 16 January – 27 February 2026

Algojo is an Indonesian action drama television series produced by Screenplay Films. It premiered on January 16, 2026, on the streaming service Vidio. The series is directed by Rahabi Mandra and stars Arya Saloka, Caitlin Halderman, and Randy Pangalila. Episodes are released weekly on Fridays at 07:00 Western Indonesian Time (UTC+7).

== Synopsis ==
The series follows Zar, an anjelo (a local term for a driver who transports sex workers), who lives with his father. Their routine changes when his father becomes unintentionally involved in a major criminal case that places him at risk. While attempting to determine the circumstances surrounding the case and to protect his family, Zar becomes connected to a covert group of contract killers known as the Algojo. Over time, his involvement leads him into a broader criminal network operating in secrecy.

== Cast ==
- Arya Saloka as Zar
- Caitlin Halderman as Icha
- Randy Pangalila as Frengky
- Justin Adiwinata as Agus
- Andy/rif as Sadino
- Moh. Iqbal Sulaiman as Panjul
- Yusuf Mahardika as Gori
- Fariz Alfarazi as Tembong
- Bima Azriel as Sobri
- Ricky Saldan as Dogel
- Doms Dee as Bonge
- Deden Bagaskara as Iwan
- Meriam Bellina as Uwak Lastri
- Pipien Putri as nenek Martha
- Rio Dewanto as Tomi
- Sigit Satria as Coret
- Fandr Muhtiar as Cungkring
- Eko Priyanto as Letoy
