= John de Rantau =

Indonesian film director

- Born: 2 January 1970 (age 56); Padang, West Sumatra, Indonesia
- Citizenship: Indonesian
- Occupation: Director
- Years active: 1990s –
- Notable work: Denias Senandung Di Atas Awan; Obama Anak Menteng; Wage

John de Rantau (born 2 January 1970) is an Indonesian film director. His film Denias Senandung Di Atas Awan (Denias, Singing on the Cloud) was Indonesia's submission to the 80th Academy Awards for Best Foreign Language Film, but not nominated.

== Biography ==
De Rantau was born in Padang, West Sumatra, on 2 January 1970. He finished his studies at the Jakarta Art Institute, then began directing television serials.

De Rantau made his featured film debut in 2005 with Mencari Madonna (Looking for Madonna), a film about a Papuan teenager who becomes infected with AIDS and seeks a cure. The story was written by Garin Nugroho, who also produced the film. The film was intended to be submitted to several film festivals, including the Singapore International Film Festival and Shanghai International Film Festival, but disallowed as it was still in digital format, and not 35mm as required.

His second film, Denias Senandung Di Atas Awan (Denias, Singing on the Cloud), was released in 2006 and depicted a young Papuan child who must overcome racism to receive an education. The film won several awards, including Best Children's Feature Film at the Asia Pacific Screen Awards. It was also submitted to the 80th Academy Awards for Best Foreign Language Film; the film was not nominated.

In 2009 de Rantau collaborated with Nugroho on Generasi Biru (Blue Generation), a fictionalised biopic of the band Slank. In 2010, de Rantau and Damien Dematra released a fictionalised version of US president Barack Obama's childhood in Menteng, Central Jakarta. Entitled Obama Anak Menteng (Obama, Child of Menteng), the film was an adaptation of Dematra's novel of the same name. It was criticised for inaccuracy, including depicting the family as employing a transvestite maid.

De Rantau released his fourth film, entitled Semesta Mendukung (The Universe Supports), in October 2011. Inspired by Yohanes Surya, trainer of Indonesia's International Physics Olympiad team, the film followed a young Madurese child named Arief who searches for his mother through the Olympiad. After Mestakung, he directed the serial Keluarga Minus (Minus' Family), which starred Minus Karoba; de Rantau had been helping Karoba's career since the latter appeared in Mencari Madonna and Denias.
