= Gigi (Indonesian band) =

Indonesian rock band

- Origin: Bandung, Indonesia
- Genres: Pop rock, hard rock, rock, alternative rock, funk rock, soft rock
- Years active: 1994–present
- Labels: Atlantic (1994–1996), Ceepee Production (1997–1998), Sony Music, Columbia (1998–2008), Universal, Island, Mercury (2009–2011), Demajors (2011–present)
- Spinoffs: dr.pm; Tiket; Evo; Baron Soulmates
- Members: Armand Maulana; Dewa Budjana; Thomas Ramdhan; Gusti Hendy
- Past members: Aria Baron; Ronald Fristianto; Opet Alatas; Budhy Haryono

Gigi (pronounced [ˈɡiɡi]) is an Indonesian rock band led by founder, Armand Maulana, and songwriter Dewa Budjana. Formed in March 1994, the band has released fifteen studio albums. Other than their hit songs "11 Januari", "Nakal", and "My Facebook" which achieve moderate success in Indonesia, the band is known for their releases of religious compilation albums, international recognition and solo career of guitarist Dewa Budjana, and the audition of vocalist of Armand Maulana for INXS.

== History ==
=== 1993 - 1994: Early Days and Formation ===
Armand Maulana, the vocalist, has already established his own musical career, being the lead singer of Next Band, and have just released his solo album "Kau Tetap Milikku" in 1993. Aria Baron's career was also on the rise since he joined (and later quit) Lost Angels (which later became Boomerang) and Badai Band (which later became /rif). Thomas Ramdhan (bassist) and Ronald Fristianto (drummer) had known each other for a long time, and were often invited to the session players for Pay Burman (ex-Slank).

At that time, Dewa Budjana was starting his career, but no one wanted to play music with him, which he later said "Maybe because my music is not standard". Later, Budjana was invited by Fariz RM to fill the guitars in his song "Cinta di Balik Noda", with Meriam Bellina as the guest vocals. Then, he recorded with Spirit band, and became the session player of Twilite Orchestra.

In September 1993, Budjana, Thomas, and Ronald hanged out in Triple M studio in Central Jakarta. Pay, who was there at that time, asked Budjana "Budj, why don't you start a band with Ronald and Thomas?". Agreed, then the trio started to do rehearsals at Studio 45 in Pondok Indah, South Jakarta. With Pierre (later joined Ronald in dr.pm) as temporary vocalist, the trio was later joined by Armand Maulana as the main vocalist, and used the name BDH (Beri Daku Harapan - Give Me Hope) as the temporary name of the band.

On deciding the name of the band, Budjana jokingly say "Orangutan". With everyone laughing at that name, Budjana then again jokingly said "Gigi" (meaning "Teeth" in Bahasa Indonesia). However, the name Gigi was then approved by the other members.

=== 1994 - 1996: Angan, Dunia, 3/4 and Formation Change ===
In 1994, Gigi released their first full-length album, Angan, which expected to be sold around 100,000 copies. The second album, Dunia, was released in 1995, with hit songs of "Janji" and "Nirwana". A year later, Baron later left the band to continue his studies in United States. In that same year, Ronald was suspicious about Thomas' addiction to substances, which soured their relationship.

The band released their 3rd album, 3/4, in 1996, which Thomas then left the band and went into rehabilitation. Gigi then recruited Opet Alatas, former crew member to replace Thomas. Ronald then fired the band to pursue his career in "dr.pm", and was replaced by Budhy Haryono.

=== 1996-2004 : 2x2, return of Thomas and continuation of the band ===
Wanting to continue the band, Armand and Budjana released the next album 2x2, which considered ambitious since involved Indra Lesmana, and Billy Sheehan (the bassist of Mr. Big) as session players, and with mixing and mastering process done in the United States.

In 1999, Opet quit the band to allow Thomas rejoined the band after he finished rehabilitation process. In 2004, Budhy Haryono left the band and replaced by Gusti Hendy.

=== 2004–Present: Current formation, and spiritual albums ===
As of 2023, Gigi has released 13 main studio albums, which the latest release was recorded in Abbey Road Studios.

Since 2004, Gigi has continuously released side albums during Eid al-Fitr, which consisted of rearranged cover songs and new written songs. Starting with Raihlah Kemenangan, as of 2023 the band has released eight spiritual albums, which considered separate from their studio releases. Armand said "In the past, we heard lot of Indonesian religious albums, especially Bimbo (artist)", and later said that Armand want to bring back the atmosphere of hearing religious songs during fasting period.

== International recognition ==
Having moderate success in Indonesia, the founding member Armand Maulana and Dewa Budjana were recognised as solo artists, with Armand's notable audition for INXS, and Budjana's solo career.

Dewa Budjana's Solo Career

Since Gigi's release of 2x2, guitarist Dewa Budjana has been internationally recognized, and established as one of Indonesia's greatest guitarist of all time. In Budjana's solo album "Mahandini", he recruited international well-known musicians such as Jordan Rudess (from Dream Theater, Liquid Tension Experiment), John Frusciante (from Red Hot Chili Peppers), Mohini Dey, and Marco Minnemann (from The Aristocrats). He also collaborated with grammy winning Vinnie Colaiuta and Antonio Sanchez, also world known musicians such as Peter Erskine, Jimmy Johnson, Joe Locke, Gary Husband, Jack DeJohnette, Tony Levin, Bob Mintzer and Guthrie Govan.

Armand's Audition for INXS

In 2005, Armand Maulana was secretly invited to INXS' audition to replace Michael Hutchence in Rock Star: INXS. When the news broke, Dewa Budjana suggested to disband the band if Armand left Gigi. In the pre-audition, INXS' personnels then requested to the producer of the show to cancel the TV series, and just to proceed with Armand, since his voice sounds similar to the late Michael Hutchence. However, since Armand is late to register to the audition, even though he already considered as one of the 15 shortlisted candidate, Armand is not participating in the series, and acts as an observer of the auditions.

== Discography ==
=== Studio albums ===
- Angan (1994)
- Dunia (World) (1995)
- 3/4 (1996)
- 2 X 2 (1997)
- Kilas Balik (1998)
- Baik (1999)
- Untuk Semua Umur (For All Ages) (2001)
- Salam Kedelapan (2003)
- Next Chapter (2006)
- Peace, Love 'n Respect (2007)
- Gigi (2009)
- Sweet 17 (2011)
- Live at Abbey (2014)
- Forever in the Air (2025)

=== Other Releases ===
- Raihlah Kemenangan (2004)
- Pintu Sorga (Heaven's Door) (2006)
- Jalan Kebenaran (The Right Way) (2008)
- Amnesia (2010)
- Aku dan Aku (Me and I) (2012)
- Mohon Ampun (2015)
- Setia Bersama Menyayangi dan Mencintai (2017)

=== Compilation ===
- The Greatest Hits Live (2000)
- The Best of Gigi (2002)

=== Soundtrack ===
- Brownies (2004)

== Band members ==
=== Current members ===
- Armand Maulana – lead vocals (1994–present)
- Dewa Budjana – guitars, backing vocals (1994–present)
- Thomas Ramdhan – bass, backing vocals (1994–1996; 1999–present)
- Gusti Hendy – drums, backing vocals (2004–present)

=== Former members ===
- Aria Baron – guitars, backing vocals (1994–1995; died 2021)
- Ronald Fristianto – drums (1994–1996)
- Opet Alatas – bass, backing vocals (1996–1999)
- Budhy Haryono – drums, backing vocals (1996–2004)

Timeline

== See also ==
- List of Indonesian rock bands
