= Terowongan Casablanca =

- Theatrical poster
- Directed by: Nanang Istiabudi
- Written by: Faldhin Martha
- Produced by: Shanker R.S.
- Starring: Ardina Rasti; Asha Shara; Nino Fernandez; Aldi Taher; Jupiter Fortissimo; Ray Sahetapy; Five Vi; Ki Joko Bodo; Titi Qadarsih; Tri Yudiman; Ade Constantia; Donny Arifin; Farhad; Maria Glenon; Dicky Topan
- Production company: Indika Entertainment
- Release date: 22 February 2007
- Running time: 90 minutes
- Country: Indonesia
- Language: Indonesian

Terowongan Casablanca (The Casablanca Tunnel) is a 2007 Indonesian horror film written by Faldhin Martha and directed by Nanang Istiabudi.

== Background ==
The film is (loosely) based upon an Indonesian legend that the Casablanca Tunnel in Jakarta is haunted by a woman who went there in the 1970s to attempt an abortion, was unsuccessful, and died as a result.

== Plot ==
Refa and Astari have been a couple for a year, Astari becomes pregnant. An angry Refa lures her the Casablanca Tunnel to force an abortion, and in an attempt to flee, Astari is captured and buried alive with her unborn child. Astari returns as a vengeful ghost known as Kuntilanak to seek revenge on Refa and his friends.

== Cast ==
- Ardina Rasti as Agnes
- Asha Shara as Astari
- Nino Fernandez as Refa
- Aldiansyah Taher as Timbo
- Jupiter Fortissimo as Noldy
- Ray Sahetapy as Ray
- Five Vi as Sarah
- Ki Joko Bodo as Sangaji
- Titi Qadarsih as ibu Kunti
- Tri Yudiman as Mira
- Ade Constantia as Tina
- Donny Arifin as Onal
- Farhad as Gun
- Maria Glenon as Nyi Pandan Sari
- Dicky Topan as Bayi Astari
- Millane Fernandez

== Reception ==
Slasherpool found the film unintentionally hilarious for its poor quality and the amateurish manner of its attempt to be a serious horror film when they offered "I haven't laughed this hard in a long time. It's only unfortunate that Terowongan Casablanca wasn't intended to be funny." The reviewer panned the film as a horror, noting its sub-par sound quality, poor choices of effects, bad cinematography, bad acting, poor editing, and extreme overuse of "scary" effects, writing "they didn't have enough money to do great special effects, so instead they crammed countless of cheap effects in every scene", "bad editing can also be blamed for the ridiculous amount of loud scare noises that have been crammed into every single frame of the movie", "the incompetent director and his frantic camerawork". And of the film inadvertently being a comedy, "This is the funniest horror movie I've seen in a long time but at the same time the most atrocious one in recent memory. I can't believe people are allowed to make movies this bad", and "If you're looking for a movie so bad that you won't be able to avoid laughing through the entire thing, Terowongan Casablanca is the movie for you."

== Influences ==
The novel Terowongan Casablanca by Ruwi Meita, was written based upon the Faldin Martha screenplay ISBN 978-979-780-096-3. The book is now in libraries throughout Indonesia, and archived by Cornell University in its Asia Collection.
