= Nino Fernandez =

Indonesian actor

- Born: Nino Adrian Fernandez; 31 January 1984 (age 41); Hamburg, West Germany
- Occupation: Actor
- Years active: 2007–present
- Spouse: Stefhanie Zamora Husen (m. 2025)

Nino Fernandez (born 31 January 1984) is an Indonesian actor of Minahasan, Sundanese, German and Portuguese descent. He's the older brother of singer Millane Fernandez.

== Biography ==
Fernandez was born in Hamburg, West Germany, on 31 January 1984 to Jeffrey Fernandez, an Minahasan and Sundanese, of German-Portuguese descent and his German wife Marita; he was the second of three children born to the couple. The family moved to Indonesia when Nino was still young; once in the country, the family frequently changed homes. The young Fernandez first attended elementary school at Permata Bunda Dharma Karya UT, then transferred to Mardi Yuana 1 in Bogor when the family moved there. After the May 1998 riots, the family returned to Germany, where Nino finished his education. He later received an undergraduate degree in business from the University of Hamburg, working as a busboy in a Chinese restaurant to help pay his tuition.

After Nino's graduation, the family returned to Indonesia. Nino Fernandez took up a job as a video jockey with MTV Indonesia. In 2007 he was cast in his first featured film, Terowongan Casablanca (The Casablanca Tunnel). That year he played the lead role of Nesta in the LGBT-themed romantic comedy Coklat Stroberi (Chocolate Strawberry), directed by Ardy Octavian. The gay character proved to be Fernandez' breakthrough role, as he received numerous invitations to act and MC afterwards. Also that year he had a minor role in Nayato Fio Nuala's Kangen (Longing).

Fernandez played the character Bayu in Rudy Soedjarwo's 2008 film In the Name of Love, a film compared to William Shakespeare's Romeo and Juliet in theme. That year he also appeared in Claudia/Jasmine. In 2009 he was romantically involved with Miss Indonesia 2009 Kerenina Sunny Halim, but the couple had separated by mid-2010.

In 2009, Fernandez played the lead role of Randy in Get Married 2, a sequel to Hanung Bramantyo's 2007 hit Get Married. The film followed Randy and his new wife Mae's attempts to have a child, a role that Fernandez found challenging. That same year he portrayed the half-Dutch half-native pilot and composer Ishak Pahing in Teddy Soeriaatmadja's film Ruma Maida (Maida's House). He also appeared in several sitcoms.

In December 2020, Fernandez and fellow actress Hannah Al Rashid announced on separate Instagram posts that they have been married for a few years. The marriage was kept secret and was never reported on the media up to that point. They live together in London.

== Filmography ==
- Terowongan Casablanca (The Casablanca Tunnel; 2007)
- Coklat Stroberi (Chocolate and Strawberry; 2007)
- Kangen (Longing; 2007)
- Claudia/Jasmine (2008)
- In The Name of Love (2008)
- Get Married 2 (2009)
- Ruma Maida (Maida's House; 2009)
- Cowok Bikin Pusing (Men Make the Head Spin; 2011)
- Bidadari Bidadari Surga (Angels of Heaven; 2012)
- Operation Wedding (2013)
- Get Married 4 (2013)
- Cinta Paling Agung
- 99 Cahaya Di Langit Eropah
- Bulan Terbelah Di Langit Amerika
- Hijab (2015)
