= Dewa Budjana =

Indonesian musician and songwriter

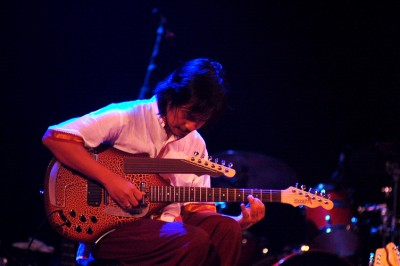

Background information
- Birth name: I Dewa Gede Budjana
- Born: 30 August 1963 (age 61); Waikabubak, East Nusa Tenggara, Indonesia
- Genres: Jazz, pop, alternative rock, hard rock, jazz fusion, soft rock
- Instrument(s): Guitar, vocals
- Years active: 1980–present
- Member of: Gigi
- Website: www.dewabudjana.com

I Dewa Gede Budjana (born 30 August 1963) is an Indonesian guitarist, songwriter and composer. He is the lead guitarist and songwriter of the band Gigi. Budjana's style changed dramatically to jazz as he got to know John McLaughlin, Pat Metheny, Jeff Beck, John Abercrombie, Chick Corea, and Weather Report. In his early experience, he established a band called "Squirrell" which was popular in the local community. Throughout his musical experience in Indonesia, Dewa Budjana has collaborated with many famous guitarists such as Tohpati, Balawan, Ridho, Abdee Negara, and many more.

Besides his collaboration with Indonesian musicians, he has also made collaborations with international musicians such as Vinnie Colaiuta, John Frusciante, Peter Erskine, Jimmy Johnson, Antonio Sanchez, Joe Locke, Gary Husband, Jack DeJohnette, Tony Levin, Jordan Rudess, Bob Mintzer and Guthrie Govan . His ability to combine not only jazz and rock but also traditional Balinese style has put him among the top Indonesian guitarists.

== Early life ==
Budjana's passion and talent in music, especially guitar, has been very dominant since he was in an elementary school in Klungkung, Bali. Budjana's first teacher was a construction worker who lived nearby. He stole money from his grandmother to buy his first guitar He prioritised guitar in his life, and started to teach himself by playing rock songs. He became more passionate about music, and was reflected when Budjana moved to Surabaya, East Java, where he took a classical music course, performed with a band and participated in many of music performances. After graduation, he went to Jakarta to pursue a career as professional musician. While there, he came across Jack Lesmana, a jazz maestro and father of jazz musician Indra Lesmana, who taught Budjana the philosophy of jazz.

== Music life ==
=== Early experience ===
In 1976, when he was thirteen, Budjana's name started to be seen in the music world in Surabaya. Later, in 1981, he bought a "real" electric guitar (an Aria Pro II) and started to play with many different people. Slowly, his musical style changed from pop rock to jazz, as he started to incorporate influences from John McLaughlin of the Mahavishnu Orchestra, Chick Corea, Yes, Gentle Giant, Kansas, Tangerine Dream, American Garage, Bright Size Life, Pat Metheny and Allan Holdsworth.

In 1980, Budjana started Squirrel, his first jazz band, with his schoolmates in Surabaya. Squirrel participated in a number of national music events, including Light Music Contest in 1984 at Teater Terbuka, TIM, Indonesia. Though many contestants participated, it was Budjana and his bandmates who outperformed the competition and won. One year after that, Budjana decided to fly to Jakarta in order to expand his music career. This journey lead him to Jack Lesmana, an Indonesian jazz legend, who introduced him to other professional musicians.

=== Professional career ===
Although Jack provided Budjana with opportunities in his Indonesian music career, it was Indra who first asked him to become a session musician. A few years later, Budjana joined the band Spirit, which included Baron, Gigi's former guitarist. With Budjana, Spirit released one self-titled album, before Budjana decided to leave the band and joined Java Jazz. He also sat in with many other bands — including the Jimmy Manopo Band, Erwin Gutawa, Elfa's Big Band and Twilite Orchestra — and participated in the North Sea Jazz Festival, a world jazz convention in The Hague, the Netherlands.

His band Gigi was formed in 1994 with Baron (guitar), Thomas (bass), Armand (vocal) and Ronald (drum). Since then, Gigi has released six albums. He has also released his own solo albums: Nusa Damai; Gitarku; Samsara; and Home, a tribute album to the December 2004 tsunami victims.

His fifth and sixth solo albums, Dawai in Paradise and Joged Kahyangan were released by Moonjune Records in 2013. Dewa said about his music: "I am trying to blend the ethnic heritage roots of my native Bali and my country Indonesia, which is a unique mix of many different cultural and ethnic influences".

=== Museum Gitarku ===
Dewa Budjana is preparing for a museum dedicated to his painted guitar collections as well as other guitars from top international guitarists, such as Steve Vai, Greg Howe, John McLaughlin, Allan Holdsworth, Guthrie Govan, Jason Becker, Buddy Guy, John Scofield, Steve Morse, and many more. The museum is located in Bali, Indonesia.

== Equipment ==
Since Dewa Budjana started his professional career as a musician, he has mainly used a Parker Fly Delux as his main guitar, occasionally using Klein and Gibson guitars SG series instead. Budjana also owns a double neck Klein guitar which was used on his album Home, and pictured on the CD cover.

== Discography ==
- Gigi
  - Angan (1994) -Dream-
  - Dunia (1995) -World-
  - 3/4 (1996)
  - 2 x 2 (1997)
  - Kilas Balik (1998) -Flash Back-
  - Baik (1999) -Good-
  - The Greatest Hits Live (2000)
  - Untuk Semua Umur (2001) -Unrated-
  - The Best Of Gigi (2002)
  - Salam Kedelapan (2003) -The 8th Greeting-
  - OST. Brownies (2004)
  - Raihlah Kemenangan (2004) -Seize The Victory-
  - Raihlah Kemenangan (repackage) (2005)
  - Next Chapter (2006)
  - Pintu Surga (2006)
  - Peace, Love 'n Respect (2007)
  - Gigi (2009)
  - Sweet Seventeen (2011)
  - Aku dan Aku (2012)
  - Live at Abbey Road (2014)
- Solo
  - Nusa Damai (1997) -Peace Island-
  - Gitarku (2000) -My Guitar-
  - Samsara (2003)
  - Home (2005)
  - Dawai in Paradise (2011) - Strings in Paradise
  - Joged Kahyangan (2013)
  - Surya Namaskar (2014)
  - Hasta Karma (2015)
  - Zentuary (2016)
  - Mahandini (2018)
  - Naurora (2021)
