= Get Married 3 =

- Theatrical poster
- Directed by: Monty Tiwa
- Written by: Cassandra Massardi
- Produced by: Chand Parwez Servia
- Starring: Nirina Zubir; Fedi Nuril; Aming; Ringgo Agus Rahman; Desta Mahendra
- Edited by: Cesa David Luckmansyah
- Music by: Slank
- Distributed by: Starvision Plus
- Release date: 27 August 2011
- Running time: 95 minutes
- Country: Indonesia
- Language: Indonesian

Get Married 3 is an Indonesian romantic comedy directed by Monty Tiwa and released in 2011. A sequel to Hanung Bramantyo's Get Married and Get Married 2, it stars Nirina Zubir and Fedi Nuril as a married couple attempting to raise their triplets while under intense pressure from their family and friends. The film was a commercial success and received favourable reviews in The Jakarta Post and Suara Karya.

== Plot ==
After having triplets, Mae (Nirina Zubir) and Rendy (Fedi Nuril) plan to raise their children without paying heed to input from their family or friends. However, Mae begins feeling a postpartum depression; to help her, Rendy asks her childhood friends Beni (Ringgo Agus Rahman), Guntoro (Dedi Mahendra Desta), and Eman (Aming) to secretly help her. Unaware that Rendy asked them to do this, Mae keeps what they do a secret from Rendy, as she thinks he still wants to raise the triplets without outside input. Mae's parents also begin helping after seeing Beni, Guntoro, and Eman with the babies.

Rendy realises that the babies have begun to prefer Mae's friends and parents to himself, causing him to feel inadequate as a father. To keep Mae's parents away, he invites her grandmother Nyai (Ratna Riantarno) to live with them. She and Mae's father Babe (Jaja Mihardja) do not get along, so her presence is hoped to keep Babe away. This goes too far, however, as Babe leaves in a fit of anger, which causes his wife (Meriam Bellina) to fear that he may divorce her. When Mae discovers that Rendy was the one who brought Nyai over, she tells him to leave.

After Mae realises that Rendy was trying to help her, she calls Beni, Guntoro, and Eman and tasks them with improving Rendy's confidence. They succeed, and Rendy is able to help Babe and Nyai work out their differences. Both Rendy and Mae's families, as well as Beni, Guntoro, and Eman, help raise the triplets.

== Production ==
Get Married 3 was produced as a sequel to Get Married and Get Married 2. Hanung Bramantyo, who had directed the previous instalments, did not return for Get Married 3. He was replaced by Monty Tiwa, who was chosen by the film's production house, Starvision. Tiwa described the film as a challenge, as he was used to working with films he had written himself. Cassandra Massardi, who had written Get Married 2, returned. Editor Cesa David Luckmansyah, who had received a Citra Award at the 2007 Indonesian Film Festival for his work in the original, also returned.

Much of the main cast returned, including Nirina Zubir as Mae – she had recently returned to filmmaking after having her child – and Ringgo Agus Rahman, Dedi Mahendra Desta, and Aming as Mae's best friends Beni, Guntoro, and Eman. Fedi Nuril played Rendy, making him the third actor to play the role and the first non-Indo. The Indonesian band Slank returned to provide the film's soundtrack, including a cover of Koes Plus' "Cubit-Cubitan" ("Pinching").

The film was shot using a RedCam camera, with colour grading provided by Technicolor Bangkok.

== Style ==
The film includes several references to current events and the entertainment industry, both in Indonesia and abroad. Bramantyo makes a cameo, and is described by the characters as an extra from Ayat-Ayat Cinta (The Verses of Love; 2007) which he had directed. Another scene shows Eman interrogated by a man who looks like Gayus Tambunan, who was infamously convicted of corruption earlier that year. The children are named Mark, Oprah, and Hanung, after Mark Zuckerberg, Oprah Winfrey, and Bramantyo.

== Release and reception ==
Get Married 3 was released on 27 August 2011, during the Eid ul-Fitr holidays; the previous instalments had also been released for the holidays. It was a commercial success, being viewed by more than 500,000 people by the end of September; the best selling Indonesian film of 2011, Surat Kecil Untuk Tuhan (A Small Letter to God), was viewed by more than 750,000 persons.

Makbul Mubarak, writing for The Jakarta Post, was highly positive in his review of Get Married 3, describing Tiwa as "a director with the best sense of humor in the country's film scene today" and the film as "the most sophisticated yet entertaining" of the three movies. Kartoyo DS, reviewing for Suara Karya, found the visuals to be of good quality.

== Bibliography ==
- "Ayo Hamil" [Come On, Get Pregnant]. Suara Pembaruan (in Indonesian). 18 September 2009. p. 16.
- Benke, Benny (18 August 2011). "Membuka Mata Batin?" [Opening the Mind's Eye?]. Suara Merdeka (in Indonesian). Archived from the original on 27 November 2015.
- Benke, Benny (29 September 2011). "Minggu Ini, "Get Married 3" Pengumpul Penonton Terbanyak" [This Week, "Get Married 3" Has the Most Viewers]. Suara Merdeka (in Indonesian). Archived from the original on 13 November 2011.
- DS, Kartoyo (7 September 2011). "Romantisme Percintaan yang Dibalut Secara Komedi" [Romanticism of Love wrapped in a Comedy]. Suara Karya (in Indonesian).
- Kurniasari, Triwik (11 September 2011). "Nirina Zubir: Juggling Motherhood and Career". The Jakarta Post. Archived from the original on 25 July 2013.
- Mubarak, Makbul (11 September 2011). "A moving yet funny comedy". The Jakarta Post. Archived from the original on 25 February 2014.
- Yazid, Nauval (26 December 2011). "2011: The Year Indonesia Forgot Movies". Jakarta Globe. Archived from the original on 15 January 2012.
