= Ki Joko Bodo =

Indonesian supranaturalist and actor (1964–2022)

Ki Joko Bodo (17 February 1964 – 22 November 2022) was an Indonesian actor.

Ki Joko Bodo starred in several films. One of his most famous films is the 2007 Indonesian thriller ghost film, Terowongan Casablanca.

Ki Joko Bodo died at his house in Jakarta on 22 November 2022, at the age of 58.

== Filmography ==
Year	Film	Role
2007	Terowongan Casablanca	Sangaji
2017	Si Juki The Movie: Panitia Hari Akhir	Mbah Gendeng (Voice Actor)
