= Raihlah Kemenangan =

- Digital cover

Studio album by Gigi
- Released: October 19, 2004
- Genre: Rock; alternative rock; pop rock; Islamic
- Label: Sony Indonesia
- Producer: Gigi

Gigi chronology
Brownies (2004)	Raihlah Kemenangan (2004)	Next Chapter (2006)

Raihlah Kemenangan is the first special studio album (eleventh overall) by the Indonesian pop rock band Gigi. Released on October 19, 2004, it consists of ten tracks, including the lead single "Tuhan". The album was re-released on September 19, 2005, with the single "Perdamaian" and a bonus track, "Itiraf".

== Commercial performance ==
The reissue of Raihlah Kemenangan has certified platinum in Indonesia, selling over 200.000 copies.

== Track listing ==
All tracks are arranged and produced by Gigi.

Standard edition
No.	Title	Lyrics	Music	Original artist(s)	Length
1.	"Ketika Tangan dan Kaki Berkata" (When the body speak)	Taufik Ismail	Chrisye	Chrisye
2.	"Dengan Menyebut Nama Allah" (Saying the name of God)	Ags. Arya Dipayana	Dwiki Dharmawan	Novia Kolopaking
3.	"Rindu Rasul" (Missing the Messenger)	Ismail	M. Samsudin Hardjakusumah	Bimbo
4.	"Keagungan Tuhan" (How great God is)	Abdul Malik Buzaid	Buzaid	Ida Laila
5.	"Lailatul Qadar"	Ismail	Wandi Kuswandi	Bimbo and Hetty Koes Endang
6.	"Tuhan" (God)	Sam	Sam	Bimbo
7.	"Raihlah Kemenangan" (To the victory)	Wieke Gur	Elfa Secioria	Elfa's Singers
8.	"Akhirnya" (I realized finally)	Deddy Dhukun	Younky Soewarno	Dhukun and Oddie Agam
9.	"KaruniaMu" (Your grace)	Thomas Ramdhan	Ramdhan	-
10.	"Hilang" (Gone)	Ramdhan	Armand Maulana; Dewa Budjana; Ramdhan; Ronald Fristianto	-

Reissue version
No.	Title	Lyrics	Music	Original artist(s)	Length
1.	"Perdamaian"	H. Abu Ali Haidar		Nasida Ria
2.	"Itiraf"	Abu Nawas		-
3.	"Ketika Tangan dan Kaki Berkata" (When the body speak)	Ismail	Chrisye	Chrisye
4.	"Dengan Menyebut Nama Allah" (Saying the name of God)	Arya Dipayana	Dwiki	Kolopaking
5.	"Rindu Rasul" (Missing the Messenger)	Ismail	Sam	Bimbo
6.	"Keagungan Tuhan" (How great God is)	Buzaid	Buzaid	Laila
7.	"Lailatul Qadar"	Ismail	Wandi Kuswandi	Bimbo and Endang
8.	"Tuhan" (God)	Sam	Sam	Bimbo
9.	"Raihlah Kemenangan" (To the victory)	Wieke	Secioria	Elfa's Singers
10.	"Akhirnya" (I realized finally)	Dhukun	Soewarno	Dhukun and Agam
11.	"KaruniaMu" (Your grace)	Ramdhan	Ramdhan	-
12.	"Hilang" (Gone)	Ramdhan	Maulana; Budjana; Ramdhan; Fristianto	-

== Personnel ==
Personnels adapted from album's liner notes.

- Armand Maulana — vocals
- Dewa Budjana — guitar
- Thomas Ramdhan — bass
- Gusti Hendy — drum
- Xa'Qhala — rap vocals ("Ketika Tangan dan Kaki Berkata")
