= Mencari Madonna =

- Directed by: John de Rantau
- Written by: John de Rantau; Garin Nugroho
- Produced by: Garin Nugroho
- Starring: Clara Sinta; Samuel Tunya; Minus C. Caroba
- Cinematography: Suadi Hutama
- Edited by: Andhy Pulung
- Music by: Fahmi Alatas
- Distributed by: SET Foundation
- Release date: 2005
- Running time: 93 minutes
- Country: Indonesia
- Language: Indonesian
- Budget: Rp 400 million

Mencari Madonna (Looking for Madonna) is a 2005 film by Indonesian director John de Rantau. Produced to raise awareness of HIV/AIDS in Papua, it starred Clara Sinta, Samuel Tunya, and Minus C. Caroba.

== Plot ==
At a mob (party) in Papua, Minus (Minus C. Caroba), a high school student, is preparing for sexual relations with twin girls. Meanwhile, his friend Joseph (Samuel Tunya) and Yolanda have sex in the shadows of the party. Unbeknownst to Joseph, Yolanda is infected with AIDS.

When Yolanda's family discover her infection, they burn her alive as she has shamed the family. Together with Minus, Joseph — now aware that he is infected — makes his way back to his hometown to look for a job cutting agarwood. In town, they meet a prostitute named Madonna (Clara Sinta), who was sent to Papua from Java by her pimp after being infected with AIDS.

When she discovers that Joseph is also infected, she takes him in, while refusing advances by other woodcutters. When he dies, Madonna and Minus mourn in their own ways, Madonna by lighting a candle and Minus by watching a video of his friend.

== Production ==
Mencari Madonna was sponsored by the Science, Esthetics, and Technology (Sains Estetik Teknologi, or SET) Foundation, which was established by Garin Nugroho; Nugroho also produced. John de Rantau was chosen to direct; it was his feature film debut, although he had shot sinetron (local soap operas) before. According to the director and producer, the film arose from a trip the two made to Papua at the behest of the current governor. In Papua, they discovered that the area's permissive attitude towards premarital sex had led it to having the second-most HIV/AIDS cases in Indonesia.

When Nugroho was unable to provide a shooting script, de Rantau and the locally-cast actors shot — Clara Sinta was the only professional actor involved — without one. The film, with a budget of Rp 400 million (US$50,000), was finished in one week. Leo Sutanto of SinemArt donated Rp 300 million towards its production.

== Style ==
Mencari Madonna minimises its depictions of violence; Evieta Fadjat, writing for Tempo, notes that several scenes, including the one in which Yolanda is burned to death by her parents, could have been further expanded on, but were only shown as flashes. She also noted that there was much symbolism involved, such as sex scenes being represented by shots of green bras. De Rantau described the film as a visual essay, which had shot using the French theory of "outer cinema".

== Release and reception ==
Mencari Madonna was released in 2005. In 2006 it was screened at the Alba International Film Festival in Italy under the title In cerca di Madonna.

Dennis Harvey, who reviewed the film for Variety when it was screened at the San Francisco Film Festival in 2006, wrote that the film had "upbeat, progressive-minded content despite melodramatics", but suffered from plot holes exacerbated by poor subtitles.
