= Generasi Biru =

Studio album by Slank
- Released: November 15, 1994
- Studio: Potlot 14; Pondok Nurul, Puncak; Bunda Emma's, Cibubur
- Genre: Hard rock; blues rock; glam metal; pop rock; rock and roll; funk rock; alternative rock
- Length: 46:53
- Label: Piss Record
- Producer: Slank

Slank chronology
Piss (1993)	Generasi Biru (1994)	Minoritas (1996)

Generasi Biru (in English translate: Blue Generation) is the fourth studio album by Indonesian hard rock band Slank, released on November 15, 1994 through their own record label, Piss Record. This is the first album produced by Slank themselves after their contract with Boedi Soesatio was discontinued. It was recorded in 1994 at Cipayung and Cibubur. This album is best known for "Kamu Harus Pulang", "Pisah Saja Dulu" and "Terbunuh Sepi" as their lead single.

Because for their high sales in all music categories around 1994 to 1995, the album won double platinum award from the BASF Awards.

== Background ==
Slank had made a breakthrough in Indonesian rock music in the 90's. Before Slank, Indonesian music was dominated by the so-called 'pop cengeng' and the creative pop genre. The various musical influences of Slank members made an impact on their music. This difference was found out by a graphic designer, Boedi Soesatio, who was also a family friend of Indra Q. Boedi Soesatio was the man who was the band's producer for their first three albums.

== Recording and development ==
After their contract with Boedi Soesatio had been discontinued, Slank decided to produce the next album themselves. Slank tried to make another breakthrough by recording the album outside a recording studio. The album was recorded in three places. Six songs were recorded at Pondok Nurul, a villa in Puncak, West Java. Two songs were recorded at Bunda Emma's place in Cibubur, West Java. The rest were recorded at their home base in Jalan Potlot. Uniquely, recording vocals for "Terbunuh Sepi" recorded in the middle of a field and in the middle of the night to give some sort of a mellow vibe. During the recording at Pondok Nurul, Pay Burman and Indra Q caught chickenpox. They had to take a break from the recording process during the illness.

They used three units of ADAT, and Super VHS format recording units owned by Indra Q. The mixing and mastering process was done by Indra Q at IQ Kamar Musik. The recording process was drawn as a sketch inside the album sleeve. This is the first time they use their new logo designed by Bongky, it was used until now.

== Release ==
This album is marketed in the form of Cassette and Compact disc with distribution assisted by ProGram/Virgo Ramayana Records. The album was at the height of the charts. Because of this, they won the award double platinum from BASF Awards.

== Track listing ==
No.	Title	Writer(s)	Length
1.	"Generasi Biru"	Bimbim, Kaka	4:53
2.	"Serba Salah"	Bimbim	2:39
3.	"Kamu Harus Pulang"	Bimbim	5:00
4.	"Blues Males"	Bimbim, Bongky, Kaka	3:57
5.	"Nggak Perawan Lagi"	Bimbim, Kaka	1:54
6.	"Hey Bung!"	Bimbim	5:17
7.	"....."	Slank	2:01
8.	"Reaksi"	Bongky, Njet, Kaka	6:06
9.	"Feodalisme (Warisan Kompeni)"	Bimbim	2:48
10.	"Birokrasi Complex"	Bimbim, Bongky, Kaka	3:49
11.	"Pisah Saja Dulu"	Bimbim, Kaka	4:25
12.	"Terbunuh Sepi"	Slank	3:59
Total length:			46:53

== Personnel ==
Slank

- Bimbim – drums, backing vocals, acoustic guitar (track 5)
- Bongky – bass, backing vocals, logo design
- Pay Burman – lead and rhythm guitar, backing vocals
- Indra Q – keyboards, mixing, engineer, mastering
- Kaka – lead vocals

Additional musicians dan production

- Slank – producer
- PISS Record – production
- ProGram/Virgo Ramayana Record – distributed
- Pulau Biru Production – management, fans club
- Moelvallo – assistant engineer
- Teddy Riady – mic advisor
- Budi, Umar, Jeber, Jager, Mardi – crew
- Dimas Djay – art director, design artwork & photo
- Andy "Cole" Sultan – design
- Oppie Andaresta – backing vocal on "Generasi Biru"
- Sara Wijayanto – backing vocal on "Kamu Harus Pulang"
- Njet Barmansyah – backing vocal on "Reaksi"
