= Meriam Bellina =

Indonesian actress (born 1964)

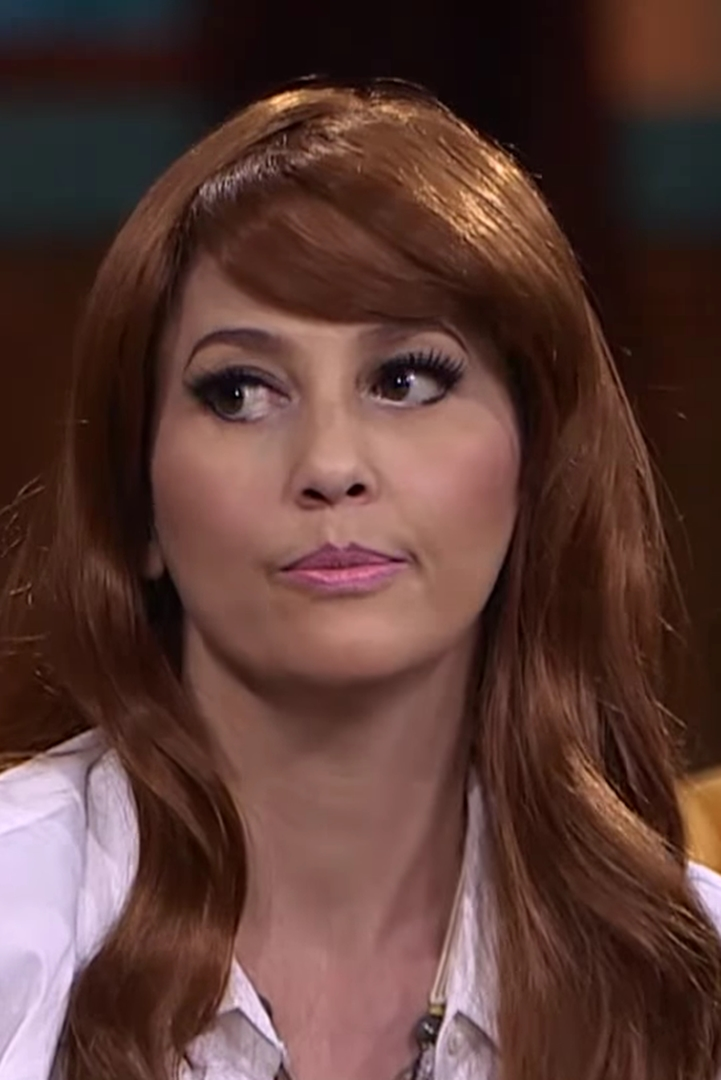
- Born: Ellisa Meriam Bellina Maria Bamboe; 10 April 1965 (age 60); Bandung, West Java, Indonesia
- Occupations: Actress singer
- Awards: Citra Award for Best Leading Actress 1984 Cinta Di Balik Noda 1990 Taksi Citra Award for Best Supporting Actress 2007 Get Married

Ellisa Meriam Bellina Maria Bamboe (born 10 April 1965), or better known by her stage name as Meriam Bellina, is an Indonesian actress who has won three Citra Awards and acted in more than 50 films. Born and raised in Bandung, she dropped out of senior high school to begin a career as a model and actress. By the mid-1980s she was recognised as a "sex bomb" and "fantasy girl". During the 1990s she focused mostly on television series, but she has produced several feature films since 2007. She is known to have mixed Austrian and Bugis Bone blood.

== Biography ==
Meriam was born in Bandung, West Java, on 10 April 1965. Born to G.H. Bamboe and Maria Theresia, she has five siblings, she is of mixed European, Buginese Sundanese descent. She initially wanted to become a stewardess for the airline Garuda Indonesia, but began acting, modelling, and singing while studying in Dago Catholic High School, Bandung. She made her feature film debut in Perawan-perawan (1981) before rising to fame after starring as the titular character in Ami Priyono's 1982 film Roro Mendut, an adaptation of the traditional legend as told by Y. B. Mangunwijaya; after performing sexualised scenes with costar Mathias Muchus, she was dubbed Indonesia's sex bomb. For Perkawinan 83, also released that year, Meriam found further critical claim.

Owing to her increasingly busy schedule, Meriam dropped out of senior high school while in her second year to focus on her career. During the 1980s she released several albums: Simfoni Rindu, Untuk Sebuah Nama and Belajar Menyanyi. These were often collaborations with Pance F. Pondaag. Her films of this period often included steamy scenes; one, in Wim Umboh's Pengantin Pantai Biru, had her having sex while on a deserted island inhabited by savage natives. Bruce Emond of The Jakarta Post later described her as "the fantasy girl come true for the movie-going public".

Meriam had a surge of popularity again in 1987 after starring alongside Didi Petet in Catatan Si Boy. Her films of this period included several romances and comedies, some featuring the troupe Warkop. In the 1990s she acted in several films, including Arifin C. Noer's Taksi.

Following a decrease in proceeds from the domestic cinema, in the early 1990s Meriam began to focus on television series. She received an award for her role in the series Aku Mau Hidup in 1994; other series included Atas Nama Cinta dan Anakku (1995), Wanita (1996), and Bundaku Terpidana. Between 1993 and 2006 she only acted in a single feature film, Kafir (2002).

Beginning in 2007 Meriam returned to regular film production when she took a supporting role in Hanung Bramantyo's comedy Get Married portraying the main character Mae's mother. This was followed by a series of comedies, including two sequels to Get Married (in 2009 and 2011) and the Raditya Dika-written film Cinta Brontosaurus.

== Personal life ==
Meriam married fellow co-actor Adi Surya Abdi. She has been divorced in marital relationships twice and, as of 2009, has two sons. In March 2012 she reported her then-boyfriend, lawyer Hotman Paris Hutapea, to the police for allegedly physically abusing her and harassing her through text messages and phone calls. After several months of arguments and court struggles the case was settled: Meriam withdrew her report and Hutapea agreed to end their relationship and recant a statement that they had married in Las Vegas.

== Filmography ==
As of 17 May 2013, Meriam has acted in 59 films. During the early stages of her career she was not selective, acting in a variety of genres.

- Koboi Sutra Ungu (1981)
- Perawan-perawan (1981)
- Roro Mendut (1982)
- Perkawinan 83 (1982)
- Dongkrak Antik (1982)
- Neraca Kasih (1982)
- Pengantin Pantai Biru (1983)
- Bumi Bulat Bundar (1983)
- Senjata Rahasia Nona (1983)
- Sorga Dunia di Pintu Neraka (1983)
- Susana-Susana Buktikan Cintamu (1984)
- Permata Biru (1984)
- Cinta di Balik Noda (1984)
- Pelangi di Balik Awan (1984)
- Kabut Perkawinan (1984)
- Bercinta dalam Badai (1984)
- Dia yang Tercinta (1984)
- Kerikil-Kerikil Tajam (1984)
- Titik-Titik Noda (1984)
- Untuk Sebuah Nama (1985)
- Tak Ingin Sendiri (1985)
- Romantika (Galau Remaja di SMA) (1985)
- Kulihat Cinta di Matanya (1985)
- Ketika Musim Semi Tiba (1986)
- Selamat Tinggal Jeanette (1987)
- Tatkala Mimpi Berakhir (1987)
- Makin Lama Makin Asyik (1987)
- Catatan Si Boy (1987)
- Bayar Tapi Nyicil (1988)
- Catatan Si Boy II (1988)
- Namaku... Joe (1988)
- Joe Turun ke Desa (1989)
- Si Kabayan dan Gadis Kota (1989)
- Bercinta dalam Mimpi (1989)
- Catatan Si Boy III (1989)
- Nona Manis (1990)
- Catatan Si Boy IV (1990)
- Sejak Cinta Diciptakan (1990)
- Boneka dari Indiana (1990)
- Wanita (1990)
- Taksi (1990)
- Bernafas dalam Lumpur (1991)
- Bukan Main (1991)
- Peluk Daku dan Lepaskan (1991)
- Saat Kukatakan Cinta (1991)
- Taksi Juga (1991)
- Asmara (1992)
- Kafir (2002)
- Get Married (2007)
- Tulalit (2008)
- Basahhh... (2008)
- XXL: Double Extra Large (2009)
- Get Married 2 (2009)
- Love and Eidelweiss (2010)
- Kabayan Jadi Milyuner (2010)
- Get Married 3 (2011)
- BrokenHearts (2012)
- Test Pack: You're My Baby (2012)
- Cinta Brontosaurus (2013)
- Honeymoon (2013)
- Slank Nggak Ada Matinya (2013)
- Kukejar Cinta ke Negeri Cina(2014)
- Hijab (2015)
- 99% Muhrim: Get Married 5(2015)
- Jagoan Instan(2016)
- Surat Cinta Untuk Starla the Movie(2017)

== Awards and nominations ==
Year	Award	Category	Recipients	Result
Indonesian Film Festival	1983	Citra Award for Best Leading Actress	Perkawinan 83	Nominated
Indonesian Film Festival	1984	Citra Award for Best Leading Actress	Cinta Di Balik Noda	Won
Indonesian Film Festival	1985	Citra Award for Best Leading Actress	Kabut Perkawinan	Nominated
Indonesian Film Festival	1986	Citra Award for Best Leading Actress	Kulihat Cinta Di Matanya	Nominated
Indonesian Film Festival	1988	Citra Award for Best Leading Actress	Tatkala Mimpi Berakhir	Nominated
Indonesian Film Festival	1990	Citra Award for Best Leading Actress	Taksi	Won
Indonesian Film Festival	2007	Citra Award for Best Supporting Actress	Get Married	Won
Indonesian Film Festival	2012	Citra Award for Best Supporting Actress	Test Pack	Nominated

== Works cited ==
- "Ayo Hamil" [Come On, Get Pregnant]. Suara Pembaruan (in Indonesian). 18 September 2009. p. 16.
- Emond, Bruce (22 April 2009). "'Pretending in real life is the worst part of celebrity'". The Jakarta Post. Archived from the original on 7 March 2013.
- "Filmografi Meriam Bellina" [Filmography for Meriam Bellina]. filmindonesia.or.id (in Indonesian). Konfiden Foundation. Archived from the original on 3 August 2014.
- "Guess what?: Meriam, Hotman make peace". 1 May 2012. Archived from the original on 15 May 2012.
- Heider, Karl G (1991). Indonesian Cinema: National Culture on Screen. Honolulu: University of Hawaii Press. ISBN 978-0-8248-1367-3.
- "Hotman downplays Meriam's police report". 29 March 2012. Archived from the original on 1 April 2012.
- "Meriam Bellina". filmindonesia.or.id (in Indonesian). Konfiden Foundation. Archived from the original on 1 September 2013.
- "Meriam Bellina" (in Indonesian). Taman Ismail Marzuki. Archived from the original on 14 February 2021.
- Muryanto, Bambang (9 December 2012). "Donny, Acha win Citra Awards". The Jakarta Post. p. 2. Archived from the original on 16 July 2013.
- "Penghargaan Meriam Bellina" [Awards for Meriam Bellina]. filmindonesia.or.id (in Indonesian). Konfiden Foundation. Archived from the original on 2 August 2014.
- "Roro Mendut". filmindonesia.or.id (in Indonesian). Konfiden Foundation. Archived from the original on 3 April 2014.
