= Denias, Senandung Di Atas Awan =

- Directed by: John de Rantau
- Written by: Jeremias Nyangoen; Masree Ruliat
- Produced by: Hartawan; Wiwid Setya; Ari Sihasale; Nia Zulkarnaen
- Cinematography: Yudi Datau
- Distributed by: Alenia Pictures
- Release date: October 19, 2006
- Running time: 110 minutes
- Country: Indonesia
- Languages: Indonesian, Papuan Malay

Denias, Senandung Di Atas Awan (Denias, Singing on the Cloud) is a 2006 Indonesian film directed by John de Rantau. This film was starring Albert Fakdawer, Ari Sihasale, Nia Zulkarnaen and Marcella Zalianty.

The film received the 2007 Asia Pacific Screen Award for Best Youth Feature Film.

== Cast ==
- Mathias Muchus as Pak Guru
- Nia Zulkarnaen
- Ryan Stevano William Manoby as Noel
- Pevita Eileen Pearce as Angel
- Minus Coneston Karoba as Enos
- Albert Fakdawer as Denias
- Michael Jakarimilena as Denias'Father
- Audrey Pailaya
- Ari Sihasale as Maleo
- Marcella Zalianty
