= The Blue Generation =

- Generasi Biru
- Directed by: Garin Nugroho; John De Rantau; Dosy Omar
- Written by: Garin Nugroho
- Starring: Bimbim; Kaka; Ridho; Abdee; Ivanka; Nadine Chandrawinata; Chichi Kadijono
- Cinematography: Arya Tedja; Padri Nadeak
- Edited by: Andhy Pulung
- Music by: Slank
- Production companies: Set Film Workshop; Shooting Star
- Distributed by: Shooting Star
- Release date: February 6, 2009
- Running time: 90 minutes
- Country: Indonesia
- Language: Indonesian

The Blue Generation, known as Generasi Biru in Indonesian, is a documentary and musical film directed by Garin Nugroho about the Indonesian band Slank. The movie is named after the band's first album.

== Synopsis ==
The film is about the Indonesian rock band Slank which is known for its political lyrics describing the state of Indonesia and hoping for a better future there. The film features documentary clips mixed with recorded dance segments, live footage, and animated segments. The film also features parts which involve the members of the band meeting five different characters that have experienced violence and trauma and are seeking to escape to an island of freedom called the blue island. The members of the band help these characters resolve their trauma and head to the blue island. The journey to the blue island is likened to a journey through Indonesia from the years 1989 to 2009, encompassing the Soeharto era, the Reformation era, and the modern era which is entitled the era of street gossip by the group.

== Reception ==
The film was successful and was shown at the Berlin International Film Festival in 2009. A song from the soundtrack named Slank Dance became popular in Indonesia due to its lyrics about freedom and democracy and its associated dance routine.
