= Little Obama =

Obama Anak Menteng
- Theatrical poster
- Directed by: Damien Dematra; John de Rantau
- Written by: Damien Dematra
- Produced by: Raam Punjabi; Damien Dematra
- Starring: Hasan Faruq Ali, Cara Lachelle, Radhit Syam
- Cinematography: German G. Mintapradja
- Edited by: Andi Pulung Waluyo
- Music by: Tya Subiyakto Satrio
- Production company: Multivision Plus Pictures
- Distributed by: Multivision Plus Pictures
- Release date: July 1, 2010
- Running time: 105 minutes
- Country: Indonesia
- Languages: Indonesian; English
- Budget: $1 million

Little Obama (Indonesian: Obama Anak Menteng, lit. Obama, the Menteng Kid) is a 2010 biopic drama film written and directed by Indonesian author Damien Dematra in collaboration with John de Rantau. The film is based on Dematra's novel by the same name. Both the book and the film are a fictionalized account of the childhood of Barack "Barry" Obama, the 44th President of the United States, who lived in Indonesia from 1967 to 1971.

== Plot ==
Barack "Barry" Obama (Hasan Faruq Ali) moves with his mother Ann Dunham (Cara Lachelle) and stepfather Lolo Soetoro (Radhit Syam) from Menteng to another suburb in Jakarta, Indonesia. Barry befriends two neighborhood children, Slamet (Angga Putra) and Yuniardi, by playing ping pong. He makes more friends at his school. Although his Indonesian is fluent, the other children find Barry strange ("aneh") because of his long nose, curly hair, and black skin. Most can overcome this difference, but the local bully Carut (Yehuda Rumbindi) confronts Obama. The two, and their groups of friends, fight. Barry returns home with a bruised face.

Lolo teaches Barry to box with the help of the effeminate, cross-dressing manservant Turdi (Teuku Zacky). Ann, however, dislikes violence and begins to consider Indonesia a poor place to raise her son. When Barry is playing marbles with his friends, Carut comes with his gang and disrupts the game. In the resulting brawl, Barry punches Carut and pushes his face in the wet mud, humiliating the bully. As Lolo and Turdi praise Barry, Ann tells him that he should apologize to Carut. This advice, which Barry and Lolo reject, leads to a series of fights between Barry's parents.

Carut then challenges Barry and his friends to a game of soccer, with a cash prize for the winners. Lolo and Turdi begin training the boys so that they can win; Turdi also teaches the girls how to be cheerleaders. As the game approaches, Barry cuts his leg on a barbed wire fence and is rushed to the local clinic, where the nurses and doctors are unwilling to treat him unless he waits in the long line for his turn. Disgusted, she calls her father in Hawaii and tells him they will be sending Barry there, hoping to give him a better chance for success.

On the day of the game, Barry has trouble running but is able to lead his team to victory. After seeing Carut's disappointment, Barry and his team talk to the bully and give him the prize money. Barry further apologizes to him, and the two groups are able to be friends. When Barry returns home, his mother tells him that he will be returning to Hawaii to live with his grandparents. Although devastated, Barry listens. His only regret before leaving is being unable to say goodbye to Slamet.

Twenty-six years later, Barry is inaugurated as President of the United States. Slamet watches on television, recalling his childhood with the new president.

== Production ==
Originally planned for 2011, principle filming began the week of May 10, 2010 in the west Java city of Bandung, in Cimahi, West Java, about 110 miles (180 kilometers) southeast of Jakarta. The Bandung location was chosen due to its resemblance to the upscale Menteng neighborhood where Obama had grown up in the 1970s. The film's script was written in three to four weeks and underwent four revisions before it was finalized. It was shot over a period of 25 days, being "rushed" through production in order to be ready for a screening on June 17, 2010, set to coincide with President Obama's planned state visit to Indonesia. Upon cancellation of Obama's visit, the film premiere was rescheduled to July 1, 2010.

Director Dematra is quoted as stating that the film is "60 percent fact and 40 percent fiction". "This is not so much a movie about Barack Obama, but rather about a 10-year-old African-American kid who landed in Indonesia for the first time, and who was going to be confronted with racism, difference and pluralism. And it is this confrontation that may have helped him to become the president of the United States." "It's about his friendships, his hobbies, just a childhood story," said Dematra. "It's not about politics, it's just the story of a boy."

The 100-minute bilingual film was scheduled for release in 60 main theaters nationwide. Multivision Plus Pictures, one of Indonesia's largest film companies, is the production company and distributor. They may seek international release depending on demand, and negotiations are underway for a screening in the United States.

== Reception ==
The premiere in Jakarta was attended by Indonesian-known actors, celebrities, political leaders, and U.S. Ambassador Cameron Hume. Viewers made note that the film was less a historical re-enactment, and more simply a story of a young boy growing up in a strange neighborhood and adapting to a new culture. The Jakarta Globe reported that Seto Mulyadi, the chairman of the National Commission for Child Protection, said "This movie could definitely be an inspiration for children in Indonesia about how amazing the power of dreams are."

Commentator Wimar Witoelar wrote that "The film doesn't show the sensitivities of his adjustment as well as Obama's book Dreams From My Father. But for those not familiar with the Obama story, it offers a decent impression of his trials and tribulations and ultimate victory. Many inaccuracies make the movie a rich target for those who concentrate on detail, which could have been avoided had the producers not aimed for a deadline set by President Obama's June visit, which was cancelled at the last minute."

Dan Abramson of Huffington Post compared the film's trailer to The Karate Kid films. The Week wrote that Little Obama "promises to shed new light on the young "Barry" Obama."

== Cast ==
Hasan Faruq Ali, a 14-year-old American, plays the role of young Barry Obama. Ali was born in Questa, New Mexico, to musicians Shakur Ali and Naseem Nahid, both members of a Sufi Muslim band. South African-born actress Cara Lachelle portrays Obama's mother Ann Dunham, while Indonesian actor Eko Noah portrays stepfather Lolo Soetoro.

== The novel ==
Book cover

Dematra interviewed 30 people prior to writing the novel, Obama Anak Menteng (literally Obama, the Menteng Kid) ISBN 978-979-22-5494-5, which he completed in just four days after one month of research. The novel was published in March 2010 by Gramedia, and had its official launch at Obama's former school, State Elementary School Menteng 01, on March 15, 2010. The novel received some criticism for its portrayal of Obama reciting the Qur'an and praying towards Mecca. When interviewed, director Dematra emphasized that while the scenes are true, the story is not about Obama praying, and he had not decided whether the scene would appear in the film adaptation. It subsequently developed that the scene did not make it into the film, having been dropped as being deemed "too political". The director stated, "That scene wasn't shot because I didn't want people to take it out of context and use it against him".

== See also ==
- Early life and career of Barack Obama
