= Get Married 2 =

- Directed by: Hanung Bramantyo
- Written by: Cassandra Massardi
- Produced by: Chand Parwez Servia
- Starring: Nirina Zubir; Nino Fernandez; Aming; Ringgo Agus Rahman; Deddy Mahendra Desta
- Edited by: Cesa David Luckmansyah
- Music by: Slank
- Distributed by: Starvision Plus
- Release date: 18 September 2009
- Country: Indonesia
- Language: Bahasa Indonesia

Get Married 2 is a 2009 Indonesian romantic comedy directed by Hanung Bramantyo and starring Nirina Zubir and Nino Fernandez. A sequel to the 2007 hit Get Married, it details the efforts of Mae and Rendy to have children.

Although Bramantyo initially did not intend to make a sequel, he was convinced after reading the treatment by Cassandra Massardi. The film, in which most of the original cast returned, was released on 18 September and viewed by 1.2 million persons. Critical reception was mixed, although the film did receive an award at the 2010 Bandung Film Festival. Another sequel, Get Married 3, was released in 2011.

== Plot ==
After four years of marriage, Mae (Nirina Zubir) and Rendy (Nino Fernandez) are childless. Meanwhile, her best friends Eman (Aming), Guntoro (Deddy Mahendra Desta) and Beni (Ringgo Agus Rahman) have already married and had children. This makes Mae feel pressured to quickly have a child and stresses her greatly. When Rendy forgets to come to a dinner celebrating their wedding anniversary, Mae is fed up and moves in with her parents, who try and convince her to leave Rendy.

Mae decides to try and work out her issues with Rendy, and the two begin working incessantly towards having a child. When that is unsuccessful, Mae decides that her tomboyish appearance is causing Rendy to be infertile. As such, she decides to surprise him by visiting his office after putting on make-up. However, she sees Rendy together with another woman, Vivi (Marissa Nasution) and walks out, saying that she wants a divorce. Rendy asks his mother (Ira Wibowo) to bring Mae back. However, both families fight, leaving Mae and Rendy separated.

Mae feels distraught without Rendy and often cries when she thinks no one is watching. Eman, Guntoro, and Beni try unsuccessfully to cheer her up. In an effort to live independently, Mae takes a job as a valet but faints at work; she then discovers that she is pregnant. Rendy, who is not allowed to come near her, tasks the trio with watching over her. However, since Mae is very demanding and requires constant attention, Eman, Guntoro, and Beni are nearly estranged from their wives. Mae secretly begins meeting with Rendy, despite her parents' insistence that she divorce him. She learns that he has not been having an affair, and they reunite. Later, Mae gives birth to triplets, and both families look on happily.

== Production ==
The film was directed by Hanung Bramantyo, a Yogyakarta-born director who had recently directed numerous Islamic-themed films, including the blockbuster Ayat-Ayat Cinta (Verses of Love) the previous year. Bramantyo's betrothed, Zaskia Adya Mecca, worked part-time as a casting director. Bramantyo later stated that he was interested in comedies about marriage, generally considered a serious subject in Indonesia, as "nobody understood marriage", from the President to a pedicab driver.

Get Married 2 was a sequel to Bramantyo's 2007 film, Get Married, which detailed how Mae and Rendy fell in love. The film had been a critical and commercial success, being viewed by 1.4 million people and winning Bramantyo a Citra Award for Best Director at the 2007 Indonesian Film Festival. Initially, Bramantyo did not want to make a sequel. However, when he read Cassandra Massardi's treatment, he agreed. Most of the main cast from the first film – Nirina Zubir, Ringgo Agus Rahman, Aming, and Deddy Mahendra Desta – reprised their original roles, but the Indo actor Nino Fernandez replaced Richard Kevin as Rendy.

The rock band Slank was contracted to provide the soundtrack. Although the band had previously had negative experiences when acting in Generasi Biru (The Blue Generation; 2009), they agreed to work on Get Married 2 as they were not required to act. They recorded a total of twelve songs for the film, including two new ones.

== Release and reception ==
Get Married 2 was released on 18 September 2009, four days after Bramantyo's marriage with Mecca and towards the Eid ul-Fitr holidays. It was one of four Indonesian films released before the holidays, the others being Ketika Cinta Bertasbih 2 (When Love Prays 2), Preman in Love and the animated Meraih Mimpi (Chasing Dreams). Get Married 2 was a commercial success, being viewed by 1.2 million persons; it was the fourth best-selling Indonesian film of 2009, behind Ketika Cinta Bertasbih, Ketika Cinta Bertasbih 2, and Garuda di Dadaku (Garuda on My Chest). The film won Best Poster at the 2010 Bandung Film Festival.

The reviewer for the Bali Post found the film enjoyable and praised the cast's performances. The review in Suara Pembaruan found the film very similar to the first, and complained that the comedy trio of Rahman, Aming, and Desta – major characters in the first film – were underdeveloped in the sequel.

Get Married 2 was followed by Get Married 3, directed by Monty Tiwa and released in 2011. It followed Mae and Rendy's struggle to raise their triplets, with both families attempting to exert control. In the third instalment, a Pribumi actor, Fedi Nuril, played Rendy.

== Bibliography ==
- "Ayo Hamil" [Come On, Get Pregnant]. Suara Pembaruan (in Indonesian). 18 September 2009. p. 16.
- "Empat Film Nasional Memeriahkan Lebaran" [Four National Films Brighten the Holidays]. Bali Post (in Indonesian). 17 September 2009.
- "Hanung Bramantyo". KapanLagi.com (in Indonesian). Archived from the original on 29 November 2011.
- Kurniasari, Triwik (27 December 2009). "Cinema comes out of the dark ages". The Jakarta Post. Archived from the original on 29 March 2010.
- Kurniasari, Triwik (22 August 2010). "Zaskia Adya Mecca: Juggling family and movies". The Jakarta Post. Archived from the original on 30 June 2012.
- Mariani, Evi (23 March 2008). "Hanung Bramantyo: Hitting the right marks". The Jakarta Post. Archived from the original on 23 September 2009.
- Mubarak, Makbul (11 September 2011). "A moving yet funny comedy". The Jakarta Post. Archived from the original on 25 February 2014.
- "Penghargaan Get Married 2" [Awards for Get Married 2]. filmindonesia.or.id (in Indonesian). Jakarta: Konfiden Foundation. Archived from the original on 11 May 2017.
- "Slank calls cut on movie making". The Jakarta Post. 23 September 2009. Archived from the original on 18 December 2013.
- Yazid, Nauval (27 September 2009). "A variety of local flicks for the Lebaran holiday". The Jakarta Post. Archived from the original on 10 January 2010.
