= Get Married (film) =

- Poster
- Directed by: Hanung Bramantyo
- Written by: Musfar Yasin
- Produced by: Chand Parwez Servia
- Starring: Nirina Zubir; Aming; Deddy Mahendra Desta; Ringgo Agus Rahman; Richard Kevin; Jaja Mihardja; Meriam Bellina
- Music by: Slank
- Production company: Starvision Plus
- Distributed by: Starvision Plus
- Release date: October 2007
- Running time: 105 minutes
- Country: Indonesia
- Language: Indonesian
- Box office: Rp34 billion (US$2.5 million)

Get Married is a 2007 Indonesian romantic comedy film directed by Hanung Bramantyo. It stars Nirina Zubir, Aming, Deddy Mahendra Desta, Ringgo Agus Rahman, Richard Kevin, Jaja Mihardja, and Meriam Bellina, it tells of a young tomboy who is forced to find a husband. The film had four sequels: Get Married 2 (2009), Get Married 3 (2011), Get Married 4 (2013) and 100% Muhrim: Get Married 5 (2015).

== Plot ==
The tomboy Mae (Nirina Zubir) and her three male friends Eman (Aming), Beni (Ringgo Agus Rahman) and Guntoro (Deddy Mahendra Desta) live in village in Jakarta. Each is miserable due to not achieving his or her goals. Meanwhile, Mae's parents (Jaja Mihardja and Meriam Bellina), realise that their daughter has never acted feminine nor begun working, which they fear will make her undesirable to prospective husbands. They also fear that her friendship with Eman, Beni, and Guntoro will give pause to any interested men.

At first, the parents find some teachers, then a young athlete; Mae is not interested, and – using a red handkerchief – signals to her friends to chase them away. When the athlete tells his boss, Rendy (Richard Kevin), about Mae, the latter decides to visit. She falls in love at first sight. Rendy, who is being hounded by his mother to marry quickly, is tall, handsome, wealthy, and well educated. Rendy, who is looking for a girl like no other, likewise falls in love with Mae. As Eman, who is standing watch, is colour blind, he misinterprets the signal and together with Beni and Guntoro he accosts Rendy and pummels him.

Mae's mother, distraught that Mae has still not married, falls ill and threatens to return as a ghost. Mae promises to marry quickly, and tells Eman, Beni, and Guntoro to choose who should marry her. In a competition, it is decided that Guntoro should be the groom. However, after he and Eman fall ill, Ben is chosen. The ceremony is interrupted by Rendy, who comes with his motorcycle gang and begins fighting with the villagers to take revenge for his lost honour. After Mae, who has joined the fight in her wedding kebaya, meets him, the two are able to stop the fight. Rendy and Mae are then married, with the motorcycle gang and villagers in attendance.

== Production ==
Get Married was directed by Hanung Bramantyo; it was his seventh feature film. The screenplay was written by Musfar Yasin, who had previously written Kiamat Sudah Dekat (The End is Nigh; 2003) and Nagabonar Jadi 2 (Nagobanar Becomes 2; 2007). Bramantyo later reported that he had directed the film based on his experiences growing up in a small village in Yogyakarta. The film was produced by Chand Parwez and featured songs from the band Slank.

== Themes ==
Rizal Iwan, writing for The Jakarta Post, described the film as a satire of the simplistic view of marriage commonly held in society. Bramantyo told Kompas that the film was also meant to show plurality through its characters. Irfan Budiman, writing for Tempo magazine, described Get Married as having contrasting the rich and poor, depicting the poor village people as uneducated and innocent and the rich as highly educated yet prone to violence to get their wants.

== Release and reception ==
Get Married was released in 2007. Within two months of its release, it had been seen by 1.4 million people. At the 2007 Indonesian Film Festival, Bramantyo received the Citra Award for Best Director for Get Married. It was his second such award, after winning one in 2005 for Brownies.

Iwal gave the film three out of five stars, writing that the film was funny, although Kevin had difficulty with his lines. A reviewer in Kompas wrote that the film was attractive, funny, and interesting; the review described Get Married as an "oasis amidst the onslaught of ghost films" common in the Indonesian market at the time. (Note: Original: "... ... semacam oasis di tengah gempuran film hantu-hantuan ...") Budiman also opined that the film was a respite from the omnipresent local horror films; he described the film as flowing smoothly and well worth watching.

The film has had two sequels. The first sequel, Get Married 2, was directed by Bramantyo and followed Mae and Rendy's attempts to have a child. It was released in 2009, not long after Bramantyo married Zaskia Adya Mecca. The second sequel, Get Married 3, was directed by Monty Tiwa and released in 2011. It followed Mae and Rendy's struggle to raise the triplets they had at the end of Get Married 2, with both families attempting to exert control. In each sequel the actor playing Rendy has been different, with two Indo actors playing the character in the first two films and a Pribumi actor in the third.
