= Abdee Negara =

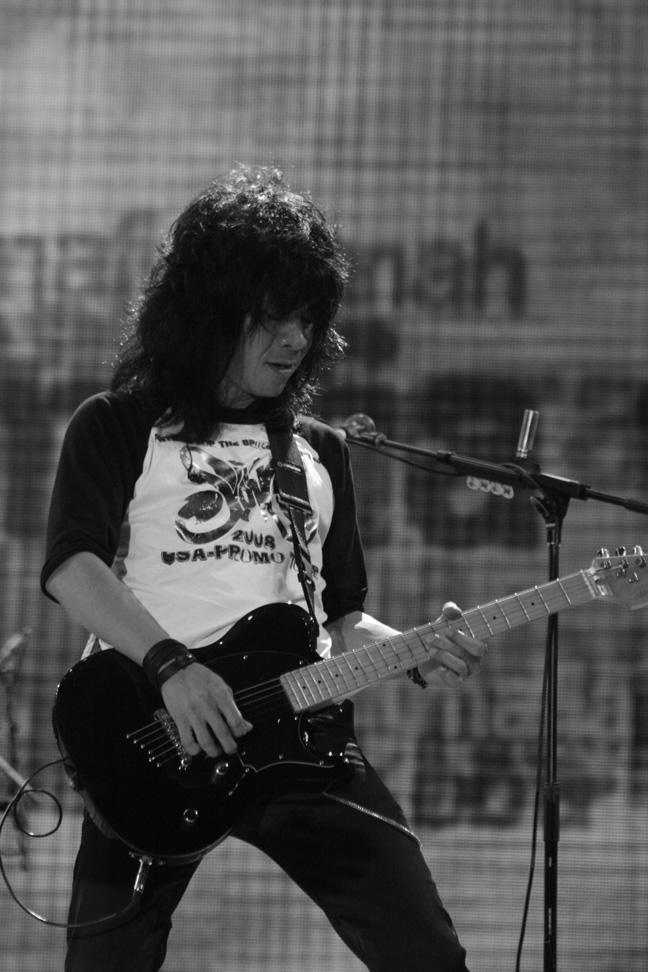

Background information
- Also known as: Abdee
- Born: June 28, 1968 (age 57); Donggala, Indonesia
- Origin: Palu, Central Sulawesi, Indonesia
- Genres: Rock; Blues rock Hard rock Pop metal Alternative rock Psychedelic rock
- Years active: 1990–present
- Labels: Slank Records
- Website: www.slank.com

Abdi Negara Nurdin also known as Abdee Negara (born June 28, 1968, in Donggala) is an Indonesian guitarist, backing vocalist, songwriter and record producer. He is best known as Slank's lead guitarist with fellow rhythm guitarist, Ridho, and also has played with many national and international guitarist, including Paul Gilbert. Besides working with Slank, his main band, he is also a producer of another Indonesian band, Serieus. Since the beginning of his career, Negara has presented a rock-blues style of playing.

== Career ==
=== Pre-Slank career ===
In the 1980s, Negara moved from Palu to Jakarta to pursue his dream to become a professional musician. His earlier musical experience was to join a band with Ecky Lamoh, Gideon Tengker and Henky Supit, all are Indonesian guitarists. In 1988, Negara entered ILW, a school of music in Jakarta, to gain his musical formal education, since he had his earlier knowledge just by autodidacticism learning. In this stage, he met Ivan, who later became a fellow member in Slank.

=== Slank ===
Kaka and Bim-Bim recruited three new members, Ridho, Ivan and Abdee Negara. Initially, the fans were not very satisfied with the appearance of new members as Slank has had six albums with the ex-members. Surprisingly, when they released their seventh album, called Tujuh (seven in Indonesian), the popularity increased dramatically and the albums sold broke the record of Slank's other albums. Nowadays, with his audio engineering skill, Negara is in charge of Slank's sound engineering and created many songs with Slank. Since he joined Slank in 1997, they have released seven hit albums in Indonesia and some Southeast Asian countries.

=== Producer ===
Negara is also a producer of another Indonesian rock band, called Seurieus.

=== Celebest FC ===
Since 2016, Abdee Negara becomes the owner of Celebest FC which this season is competing in Liga 2 after acquiring a club previously based in South Tangerang and transferring it to Palu.

== Equipment ==
Most of the time, Negara uses Fender guitar brand for recording and live performances. Two types of Fender that he commonly uses, Telecaster and Stratocaster. Not so long ago, a guitar company, named Extreme offered him to use their guitar. Then Abdee agreed to use Extreme guitar as his main gear, however, since he loves Telecaster so much, he wanted the same guitar model as Fender Telecaster to this company.

=== Discography ===
- Tujuh (1997)
- Mata Hati Reformasi (1998)
- Konser Piss 30 Kota (1998)
- 999 + 09 Biru (1999)
- 999 + 09 Abu Abu (1999)
- De Bestnya Slank (2000)
- Ngangkang (2000)
- Virus (2001)
- Virus Roadshow (2002)
- Satu Satu (2003)
- Bajakan (2003)
- P.L.U.R (2004)
- Slankissme (2005)
- Since 1983 - Malaysia Edition (2006)

== See also ==
- Slank
- Fender Musical Instruments Corporation
- Telecaster
- Celebest
