= Mohammad Ridwan Hafiedz =

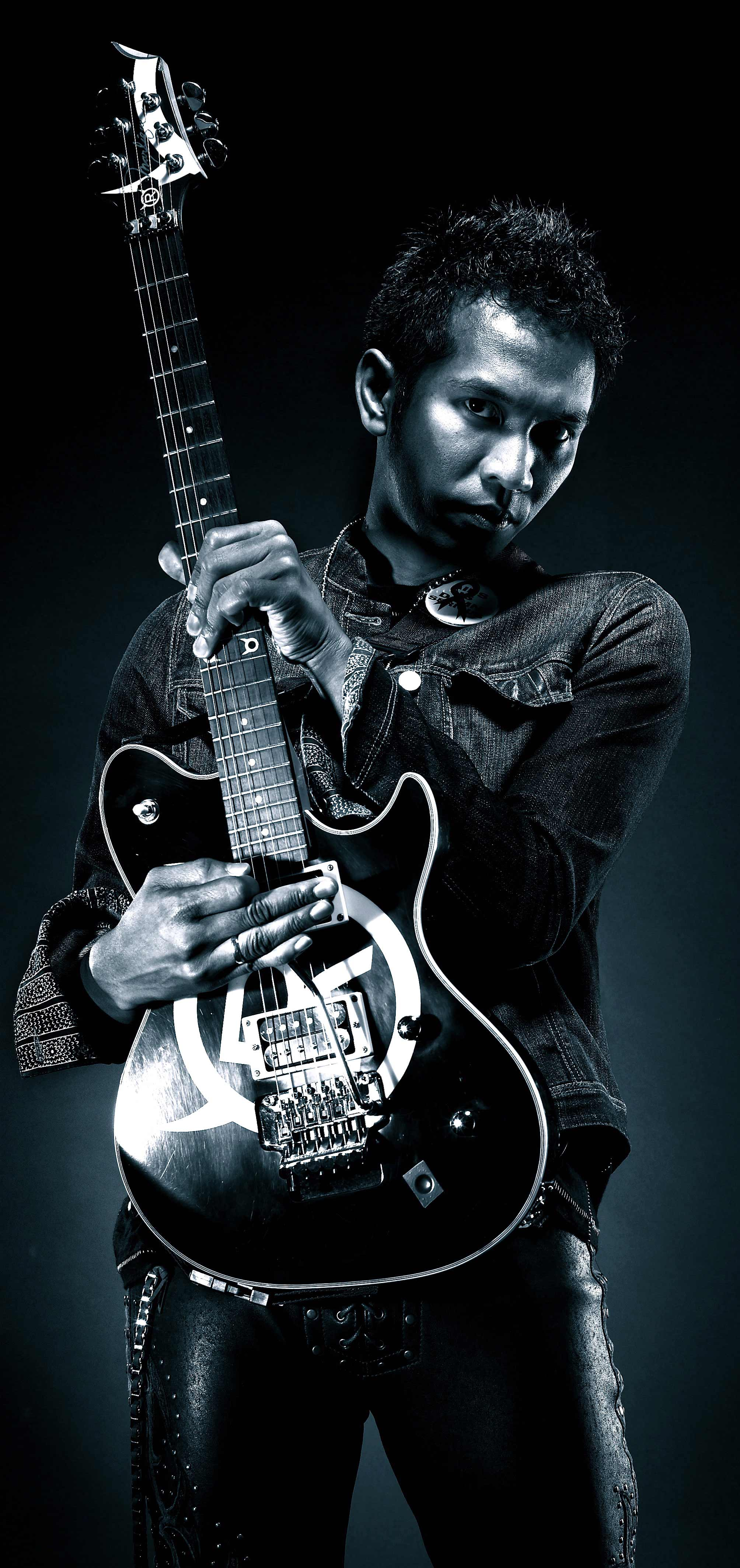

Background information
- Also known as: Ridho
- Born: September 3, 1973 (age 52); Ambon, Indonesia
- Genres: Rock, blues, hard rock, blues rock, pop rock, glam metal, rock n' roll, alternative rock, grunge
- Instruments: Guitar, keyboard, vocals, backing vocal
- Years active: 1991–present
- Label: Slank Records
- Website: http://www.slank.com

Mohammad Ridwan Hafiedz or Ridho (born September 3, 1973, Ambon, Indonesia) is an Indonesian guitarist and songwriter. He is best known as Slank's rhythm guitarist (sometimes the lead guitarist) and back vocalist along with another lead guitarist, Abdee Negara. With Slank, Ridho has created nine studio albums and three live albums, also one compilation album which was released in May 2006.

== Early life ==
Ridho was born and raised in a Muslim family from Ambon, Indonesia. He started to play guitar at the age of seven.

== Career ==
=== Pre-Slank career ===
Ridho was influenced by Jimi Hendrix and the Beatles. His experience in the music industry began when he formed a band called Last Few Minutes (LFM band) in 1991, six years before he joined Slank. After he finished his formal education, he went to Hollywood, United States, to study music at Musicians Institute.

=== Slank ===
In 1996, three from five of the members of Slank left the band. The problem arose from the drug addictions of Bimbim (drummer) and Kaka (lead vocalist). Slank recruited three new members; Abdee, Ivan, and Ridho (himself).

== Discography ==
- Tujuh (1998)
- Mata Hati Reformasi (1998)
- Konser Piss 30 Kota (1998)
- 999 + 09 Biru (1999)
- 999 + 09 Abu Abu (1999)
- De Bestnya Slank (2000)
- Ngangkang (2000)
- Virus (2001)
- Virus Roadshow (2002)
- Satu Satu (2003)
- Bajakan (2003)
- P.L.U.R (2004)
- Slankissme (2005)
- Since 1983 - Malaysia Edition (2006)

== Personal life ==
He married Ony Serojawati at August 25, 2001. The couple has four children.

== See also ==
- Slank
