= Slank =

Indonesian rock band

- Clockwise below left: Ridho, Bimbim, Kaka, Abdee, Ivanka

Background information
- Origin: Jakarta, Indonesia
- Genres: Hard rock; glam metal; blues rock; pop rock; rock and roll; alternative rock
- Years active: 1983–present
- Labels: Slank Record; VMC
- Members: Bimo Setiawan Almachzumi (Bimbim); Akhadi Wira Satriaji (Kaka); Ivan Kurniawan Arifin (Ivanka); Abdee Negara Nurdin (Abdee); Mohammad Ridwan Hafiedz (Ridho)
- Past members: see past members
- Website: www.slank.com

Slank is an Indonesian rock band. The band is known for songs which are often accompanied by political and socially conscious lyrics. It continues to be active and has received many awards from the Indonesian music industry. Along with God Bless and Dewa 19, they are dubbed one of the greatest rock bands in the history of Indonesian popular music.

Slank was founded in 1983 by teenagers in an alley street in Jakarta called Gang Potlot. The name was inspired by friends who often called them "slengean" (in Betawi, it means men who are free in terms of characteristics and actions). Slank is an abbreviation of the word "slenge'an" and changes the letter G to K to improve the aesthetic. All personnel have compromised to agree on this naming. In making music, Slank voices concern for music and the interests of all levels of society in Indonesia.

== History ==
=== Early years ===
In 1981, Bimbim as lead guitarist formed a school band in Jakarta, Indonesia that was called Cikini Stones Complex (CSC), with Kiki as rhythm guitarist, Uti as drummer and vocalist, Abi as bassist, Welly Willy as lead vocalist, and Boy as second vocalist. Bimbim and CSC performed their the Rolling Stones songs. CSC played in cafés — starting in the B Club café as their first appearance — birthday parties, independence day celebrations, and art festivals. However, because they felt tired and bored, they only performed songs from the music groups Rolling Stones, Bimbim, Kiki, Well Willy and Uti decided to leave the band after seeing no vision for the band and CSC disbanded soon after.

During a break, Bimbim a took over as drummer and Kiki a took over as their lead guitarist met three new members: Bongky Marcel as rhythm guitarist, Denny BDN as bassist, and Erwan Baswara as vocalist. The band then changed its name to Red Devil and played Rolling Stones songs. In December 1983 they changed their band name to Slank because they looked "selengean" ("rebellious" or "unruly").

The initial formation of the group based in Potlot consisted of Bimbim (drums), Denny BDN (bass), Erwan (vocals), Kiki (guitar) and Bongky (guitar). The first appearance under the name Slank was held at the National University (Indonesia), Jakarta.

=== Mainstream success ===
Their first album, Suit-Suit...He-He, was not released until 1990. This album, which featured the songs "Memang" and "Maafkan", was an enormous hit and won the band the BASF Award for best newcomer category. The album also seemed to slap the Indonesian music industry which at that time was still incessant Malay songs like Search's Isabella song. Solid rock and roll blues and a la Slank music finally got close to young people in Indonesia, and their success inspired the formation of other bands, such as Dewa. Their distinctive style, ignorant, slengean, but friendly managed to attract the masses who were then still limited to a minority.

In 1991, their second album, Kampungan, achieved the same level of success as their first album. The singles from this album, "Mawar Merah" and "Terlalu Manis", were made in two versions: Fun and Sales. Unusually, it was precisely the song version of fun, which became hits and was often played. Here Kaka plays harmonica. In this village album, Slank included the song Nina Bobo.

In December 1993, Slank releases third album, Piss!, which is a play on the word peace. This jargon became a trend at that time. The hits single of this album are "Piss" and "Kirim Aku Bunga". Their first three albums, awarded by BASF Indonesia for Best Selling Albums on BASF tapes in each years of released.

1994, Slank released their fourth album Generasi Biru with the several popular hits like "Generasi Biroe", "Terbunuh Sepi", and "Kamu Harus Pulang" entering Indonesia's top charts. This was Slank's first album to reach multi-platinum status, and the band was once again awarded by BASF Indonesia for Best Selling Albums.

Their fifth album, Minority, was released in January 1996. It featured the single "Bang Bang Tut" on the market. On the album, Bimbim sang a song of his title entitled "Bidadari Penyelamat". There is no arrangement whatsoever, only Bimbim's voice.

=== Conflicts, various changes, and struggle ===
Slank was plagued by a number of defections, some involving personal issues, others having to do with internal tensions based around creative decisions. Since its inception, Slank's band members have changed frequently. Reasons have ranged from drug use and woman to money and differences in musical styles. The best line up of the band was Kaka (vocals), Bimbim (drums), Pay (guitar), Bongky (bass) and Indra (keyboards).While working on the sixth album, Lagi Sedih, Bimbim decided to fire Bongky, Pay and Indra. But there is also a mention that Bongky, Indra and Pay quit or resigned because of the behavior of Bimbim and Kaka who have been too severe in drug use. The split can actually be seen on their fourth album in the song "Pisah Saja Dulu". Bimbim even intends to disperse Slank. But a letter written in blood by a Slanker made him discouraged. Its contents are scary. "Don't be cheeky, Bim! If Slank breaks up, it means it's wrong! I wrote this letter using blood. Don't let me write the next letter using your blood!" Letters of threat and vows to kill Bimbim if it dissolves Slank is unavoidable. Kaka and Bimbim finally continued to work on their sixth album with the help of additional musicians. Reynold entered to fill the position of guitar and Ivanka who was often hanging out at Potlot also helped in working on the Slank project for the sixth album with the formation of this transition period. The album, Lagi Sedih, was released in February 1997. Single "Koepoe Liarkoe" and "Tonk Kosong" prove that Slank can still survive. Bid gig also arrived.

=== New formation and continue success ===
The entry of Abdee and Ridho, Slank continued his musical journey. The result was the album Seven which was released in January 1997 with reliable song "Balikin". The album sold one million copies in a matter of weeks. From there, more albums, most of them commercially successful, followed. The negativity was overcome, and over the next 20 years, Slank was able to increase their profile, tour the world and maintain commercial success. In 2007, Slank released their 20th album, Slow But Sure.

Slank became the first MTV Indonesia icon in 2005.

In 2007, Slank released the new album, Slow But Sure; the album's first single "Slalu Begitu" was played heavily on Indonesian radio stations.

In 2008 Slank toured the U.S. and Europe. They have also played in various Asian countries, such as Thailand, the Philippines, Japan, and South Korea.

Having more than fifteen albums sold and occasionally causing political controversy in Indonesia, Slank decided to travel to the US to record their first English-language album, Anthem for the Broken-Hearted. Blues Saraceno was chosen to be the producer of the album. They recorded and mixed the album in only twenty-two days.

“If you want the world to see what you want to say, you better go to the highest mountain. And for music, the highest mountain now is in the U.S.A.”, says Abdee Negara.

=== Java Jazz Festival 2009 ===
In 2009, surprisingly, Slank was invited to take part in the well known Java Jazz Festival.

Their invitation to a jazz festival by Peter F. Gontha was meant as a challenge to see if they had what it took to perform in a jazz music setting. Their show, attended by thousands, successfully transformed their songs into jazz. In the spirit of reaching a greater jazz audience by combining genres, this show featured Michael Paulo, Ron King and Tony Monaco. It later was described as a "once in a lifetime experience".

== Slankers ==
For more than two decades, Slank has managed a healthy attitude towards their music career, which in turn has helped them throughout the years. Slank has also gained somewhat of a cult status in Indonesia, Slank fans are known as 'Slankers', and they have a reputation for devotion. They wave their Slank flags, which consist of the word 'Slank' shaped into a graffiti-style butterfly. They sing along with several punk rock songs and perform a stadium-worthy call-and-response routine. According to one of the guitarists Ridho, 'Slankers' span all ages from children to adults.

== Biopic ==
In 2009 Slank took part in a film called Generasi Biru that depicts their life and journey. It was directed by Garin Nugroho. For the film, Slank released a single, "Slank Dance", the video clip of which depicts members of the band performing a unique dance created by their fans, the Slankers.

== Band members ==
=== Current members ===
- Bimo Setiawan "Bimbim" Almachzumi – drums, percussion, guitar, backing and lead vocals (1983–present)
- Akhadi Wira "Kaka" Satriaji – lead and backing vocals, harmonica, tambourine, guitar, piano, drums (1989–present)
- Ivan Kurniawan "Ivanka" Arifin – bass, percussion, guitar, backing vocals (1996–present)
- Abdee Negara Nurdin – guitar, backing vocals (1997–present)
- Mohammad Ridwan "Ridho" Hafiedz – guitar, keyboards, backing vocals (1997–present)

=== Former members ===
- Ahmad "Denny" Ramdhani – bass, lead vocals (1983–1988)
- Bongky Marcel Ismail – guitar, bass, backing vocals (1983–1987, 1989–1996)
- Muh. Erwan Baswara – lead vocals (1983–1985)
- Abza Widi "Kiki" Setiaji – guitar (1983–1985)
- Adrian "Adri" Sidharta – keyboards (1985–1986, 1988)
- Rebecca Lilian "Lala" Agustina – lead vocals (1985–1986)
- Patricia Kartika "Uti" Suharyani – lead vocals (1985–1986)
- Well Welly – lead vocals (1986–1987, 1988)
- John Andrew "Andre" Pulungan – keyboards (1987)
- Parlin Burman "Pay" Siburian – guitar, backing vocals (1987, 1988–1996)
- Djimboen Wijaya – guitar (1987)
- Thomas Samuel "Sammy" Karamoy – lead vocals (1987)
- Abdul Firmansyah "Imanez" Saad – bass, guitar (1986–1987, 1987–1988; died 2004)
- James Anthony "Anto" Verhoeven – guitar, vocals (1987–1988)
- Ronald "Tole" Panggabean – bass (1988; died 1996)
- Nita Tilana – lead vocals (1988; died 2000)
- Indra Qadarsih – keyboards, backing vocals (1988–1996)
- Reynold Effendy – guitar, backing vocals (1996–1997)

== Discography ==
=== Studio albums ===
1. Suit-Suit... He-He (Gadis Sexy) (1990)
2. Kampungan (1991)
3. Piss (1993)
4. Generasi Biru (1994)
5. Minoritas (1996)
6. Lagi Sedih (1997)
7. Tujuh (1998)
8. Mata Hati Reformasi (1998)
9. 999 + 09, Vol. 1 (1999) (double album)
  999 + 09, Vol. 2 (1999)
10. Virus (2001)
11. Satu Satu (2003)
12. Road To Peace (2004)
13. PLUR (2004)
14. Slankissme (2005)
15. Slow But Sure (2007)
16. The Big Hip (2008)
17. Anthem For The Broken Hearted (2009)
18. Jurus Tandur No.18 (2010)
19. I Slank U The Album (2012)
20. Slank Nggak Ada Matinya (2013)
21. Restart Hati (2015)
22. Palalopeyank (2017)
23. Slanking Forever (2019)
24. Vaksin (2021)
25. Joged (2023)

=== Live albums ===
1. Konser Piss 30 Kota (1998)
2. Virus Road Show (2002)
3. Slank Bajakan (2003)
4. Reborn Republic Slank (2005)

=== Movie soundtracks ===
1. O.S.T. "Get Married" (2007)
2. Original Soundtrack "Generasi Biru" The Movie (2009)
3. O.S.T. "Get Married 2" (2009)

=== International albums ===
1. Since 1983 - Malaysian Edition (2006)
2. Slank feat. Big Hip - Japan Edition (2008)
3. Anthem For The Broken Hearted - USA Edition (2008)

== Awards and nominations ==
Year	Award	Category	Work/Nominee	Result	Ref.
1997	Indonesian Music Awards	Best Rock Duo/Group/Collaboration	"Balikin"	Won	
1997	Indonesian Music Awards	Best Rock Album	Tujuh	Won	
1998	Indonesian Music Awards	Best Rock Album	Mata Hati Reformasi	Won	
2003	Indonesian Music Awards	Best Rock Duo/Group	"Gara-Gara Kamu"	Won	
2003	Indonesian Music Awards	Best Rock Album	Satu Satu	Won	
2009	MTV Indonesia Awards	Most Favorite Band/Group/Duo	"Love Cursed"	Won	
2010	Indonesian Music Awards	Best Rock Album	OST Generasi Biru	Won	
2015	Indonesian Choice Awards	Band/Group/Duo of the Year	Slank	Nominated	
2017	Indonesian Choice Awards	Band/Group/Duo of the Year	Slank	Nominated	
2017	Indonesian Choice Awards	Album of the Year	Palalopeyank	Nominated	

== See also ==
- List of Indonesian rock bands
