= 1975 =

1975 (MCMLXXV) was a common year starting on Wednesday of the Gregorian calendar, the 1975th year of the Common Era (CE) and Anno Domini (AD) designations, the 975th year of the 2nd millennium, the 75th year of the 20th century, and the 6th year of the 1970s decade.

It was also declared the International Women's Year by the United Nations and the European Architectural Heritage Year by the Council of Europe.

== Events ==
=== January ===
1975 in various calendars
- Gregorian calendar: 1975; MCMLXXV
- Ab urbe condita: 2728
- Armenian calendar: 1424; ԹՎ ՌՆԻԴ
- Assyrian calendar: 6725
- Baháʼí calendar: 131–132
- Balinese saka calendar: 1896–1897
- Bengali calendar: 1381–1382
- Berber calendar: 2925
- British Regnal year: 23 Eliz. 2 – 24 Eliz. 2
- Buddhist calendar: 2519
- Burmese calendar: 1337
- Byzantine calendar: 7483–7484
- Chinese calendar: 甲寅年 (Wood Tiger); 4672 or 4465 — to — 乙卯年 (Wood Rabbit); 4673 or 4466
- Coptic calendar: 1691–1692
- Discordian calendar: 3141
- Ethiopian calendar: 1967–1968
- Hebrew calendar: 5735–5736
- Hindu calendars
- Vikram Samvat: 2031–2032
- Shaka Samvat: 1896–1897
- Kali Yuga: 5075–5076
- Holocene calendar: 11975
- Igbo calendar: 975–976
- Iranian calendar: 1353–1354
- Islamic calendar: 1394–1395
- Japanese calendar: Shōwa 50 (昭和５０年)
- Javanese calendar: 1906–1907
- Juche calendar: 64
- Julian calendar: Gregorian minus 13 days
- Korean calendar: 4308
- Minguo calendar: ROC 64 民國64年
- Nanakshahi calendar: 507
- Thai solar calendar: 2518
- Tibetan calendar: ཤིང་ཕོ་སྟག་ལོ་ (male Wood-Tiger); 2101 or 1720 or 948 — to — ཤིང་མོ་ཡོས་ལོ་ (female Wood-Hare); 2102 or 1721 or 949
- Unix time: 157766400 – 189302399

- January 1 – Watergate scandal (United States): John N. Mitchell, H. R. Haldeman and John Ehrlichman are found guilty of the Watergate cover-up.
- January 2
  - The Federal Rules of Evidence are approved by the United States Congress.
  - A bomb blast at Samastipur, Bihar, India, fatally wounds Lalit Narayan Mishra, Minister of Railways.
- January 5 – Tasman Bridge disaster: The Tasman Bridge in Hobart, Tasmania, Australia, is struck by the bulk ore carrier MV Lake Illawarra, causing a partial collapse resulting in 12 deaths.
- January 15 – Alvor Agreement: Portugal announces that it will grant independence to Angola on November 11.

=== February ===
- February 4 – The Haicheng earthquake in Haicheng, Liaoning, China, kills 2,041 and injures 27,538, but much of the city has been evacuated in a claimed example of earthquake prediction.
- February 5 – The Argentinian president Isabel Perón decrees Operativo Independencia, aiming to neutralize or annihilate the "subversive elements" in the province of Tucuman. She assumes extraordinary powers.
- February 11
  - Margaret Thatcher defeats Edward Heath for the leadership of the opposition UK Conservative Party. Thatcher, 49, is Britain's first female leader of any political party.
  - Colonel Richard Ratsimandrava, President of Madagascar, is assassinated.
- February 27 – The 2 June Movement kidnaps West German politician Peter Lorenz. He is released on March 4 after most of the kidnappers' demands are met.
- February 28
  - A major tube train crash at Moorgate station, London kills 43 people.
  - In Lomé, Togo, the European Economic Community and 46 African, Caribbean and Pacific countries sign a financial and economic treaty, known as the first Lomé Convention.
  - The National Liberation Front of Angola (FNLA) approaches the South African Embassy in London and requests 40 to 50 artillery pieces to assist their cause in the Angolan Civil War.

=== March ===
- March 1
  - Aston Villa win the English Football League Cup at Wembley, beating Norwich City 1–0 in the final.
  - Australian television switches to full-time colour.
- March 6
  - Algiers Agreement: Iran and Iraq announce a settlement in their border dispute.
  - A bomb explodes in the Paris offices of Springer publishers. The March 6 Group (connected to the Red Army Faction) demands amnesty for the Baader-Meinhof Group.
- March 9 – Construction of the Trans-Alaska Pipeline System begins.
- March 10
  - Vietnam War: North Vietnamese troops attack Ban Mê Thuột in South Vietnam on their way to capturing Saigon.
  - An extended portion of Sanyō Shinkansen between Okayama Station and Hakata Station opens, giving the Japanese Shinkansen high speed rail network access to the country's second island, Kyushu.
- March 11 – The leftist military government in Portugal defeats a rightist coup attempt involving former president António de Spínola, who flees to Brazil.
- March 13 – Vietnam War: South Vietnam President Nguyễn Văn Thiệu orders the Central Highlands evacuated. This turns into a mass exodus involving troops and civilians (the "Convoy of Tears").
- March 15 – In Brazil, Guanabara State merges into the state of Rio de Janeiro. The state's capital moves from the city of Niterói to the city of Rio de Janeiro.
- March 22 – "Ding-a-dong" by Teach-In (music by Dick Bakker, lyrics by Will Luikinga and Eddy Ouwens) wins the 20th Eurovision Song Contest 1975 (staged in Stockholm) for the Netherlands.
- March 25 – King Faisal of Saudi Arabia is shot and killed by his nephew.
- March 27 – The South African government announces that it will consolidate the 113 separate homeland areas into 36.
- March 28 – A fire in the maternity wing at Kučić Hospital in Rijeka, Yugoslavia (Croatia), kills 25 people.
- March 31 – Süleyman Demirel of AP forms the new government of Turkey (39th government), a four-party coalition, the so-called First National Front (Turkish: Milliyetçi cephe ).

=== April ===
- April 4
  - Vietnam War: The first military Operation Babylift flight, C5A 80218, crashes 27 minutes after takeoff, killing 138 on board; 176 survive the crash.
  - Bill Gates and Paul Allen found Microsoft (at this time known as Micro-Soft) in Albuquerque, New Mexico and release their Altair BASIC interpreter. (Microsoft becomes a registered trademark on November 26, 1976.)
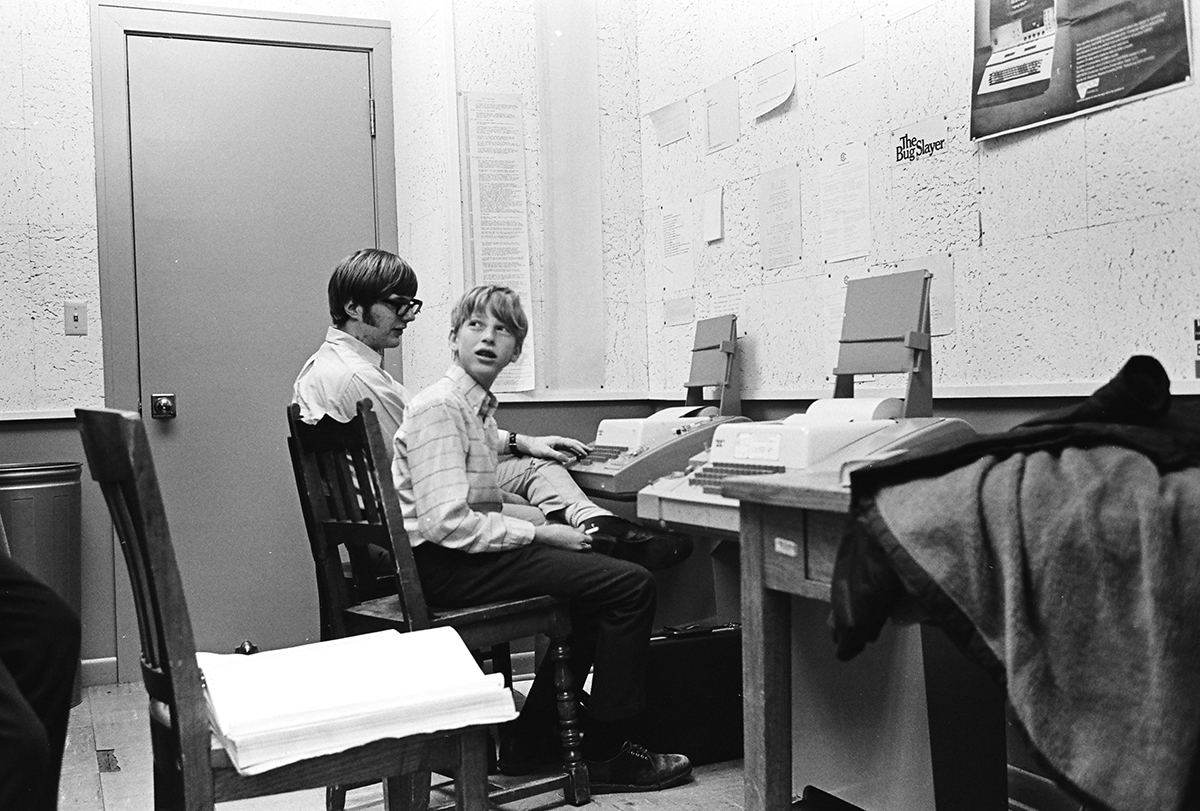
    April 4: Allen and Gates four years prior to the founding of Microsoft
- April 5 – The Soviet crewed space mission (Soyuz 18a) ends in failure during its ascent into orbit when a critical malfunction occurs in the second and third stages of the booster rocket during staging at an altitude of 192 km, resulting in the cosmonauts and their Soyuz spacecraft having to be ripped free from the vehicle. Both cosmonauts (Vasily Lazarev and Oleg Makarov) survive.
- April 9 – Eight people in South Korea, who are involved in the People's Revolutionary Party Incident, are hanged.
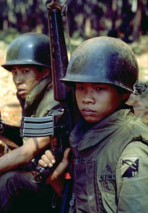
  April 9–21: Battle of Xuân Lộc
- April 13
  - Bus massacre: The Kataeb militia kills 27 Palestinians during an attack on their bus in Ain El Remmeneh, Lebanon, triggering the Lebanese Civil War which lasts until 1990.
  - A coup d'état in Chad led by the military overthrows and kills President François Tombalbaye.
- April 17 – The Khmer Republic surrenders, when the Communist Khmer Rouge guerilla forces capture Phnom Penh ending the Cambodian Civil War, with mass evacuation of American troops and Cambodian civilians.
- April 18 – The Khmer Rouge begins a forcible mass evacuation of the city and starts the Cambodian genocide.
- April 19 – Nico Diederichs becomes the 3rd State President of South Africa.
- April 20 – Taman Mini Indonesia Indah opens to the public in Jakarta, Indonesia.
- April 24 – West German Embassy siege in Stockholm: Six Red Army Faction terrorists take over the West German embassy in Stockholm, take 11 hostages and demand the release of the group's jailed members; shortly after, they are captured by Swedish police.
- April 25 – Vietnam War: As North Vietnamese Army forces close in on the South Vietnamese capital Saigon, the Australian Embassy is closed and evacuated, almost 10 years to the day since the first Australian troop commitment to South Vietnam.
- April 29 – Vietnam War: North Vietnam concludes its East Sea Campaign by capturing all of the Spratly Islands that were being held by South Vietnam.
- April 30 – Vietnam War – Fall of Saigon: The Vietnam War concludes as Communist forces from North Vietnam take over Saigon, resulting in mass evacuation of the remaining American troops and South Vietnam civilians. As the capital is taken, South Vietnam surrenders unconditionally and is replaced with a temporary Provisional Government.

=== May ===
- May 3 – West Ham United win the FA Cup at Wembley, beating Fulham 2–0 in the final.
- May 6 – The South African government announces that it will provide all Black children with free and compulsory education.
- May 15 – Mayaguez incident: The American merchant ship Mayaguez, seized by Cambodian forces, is rescued by the U.S. Navy and Marines; 38 Americans are killed.
- May 16
  - Sikkim accedes to India after a referendum and abolishes the Chogyal, its monarchy.
  - Junko Tabei from Japan becomes the first woman to reach the summit of Mount Everest.
- May 25 – Bobby Unser wins the Indianapolis 500 for a second time in a rain-shorted 174 lap, 700 km (430 mi) race.
- May 27 – The Dibbles Bridge coach crash near Grassington, North Yorkshire, England, results in 32 deaths (the highest toll in a United Kingdom road accident).
- May 28 – Fifteen West African countries sign the Treaty of Lagos, creating the Economic Community of West African States.

=== June ===
- June 5 – The Suez Canal opens for the first time since the Six-Day War.
- June 6 – The Georgetown Agreement, formally creating the ACP Group, is signed.
- June 9 – The Order of Australia is awarded for the first time.
- June 11 – After a referendum and seven years of military rule, modern-day Greece is established as the Hellenic Republic.
- June 25
  - Prime Minister Indira Gandhi declares a state of emergency in India, suspending civil liberties and elections.
  - Mozambique gains independence from Portugal.

=== July ===
- July 1 – The Postmaster-General's Department is disaggregated into the Australian Telecommunications Commission (trading as Telecom Australia) and the Australian Postal Commission (trading as Australia Post).
- July 4 – Zion Square refrigerator bombing. A terrorist attack in downtown Jerusalem kills 15 civilians and wounds 77.
- July 5 – Cape Verde gains independence after 500 years of Portuguese rule.
- July 6 – The Comoros declares and is granted its independence from France.
- July 9 – The National Assembly of Senegal passes a law that will pave way for a multi-party system (albeit highly restricted).
- July 12 – São Tomé and Príncipe declare independence from Portugal.
- July 17 – Apollo–Soyuz Test Project: A crewed American Apollo spacecraft and the crewed Soviet Soyuz spacecraft for the Soyuz 19 mission dock in orbit, marking the first such link-up between spacecraft from the 2 nations.
- July 21 – The Parliament of India votes to approve Prime Minister Indira Gandhi's declaration of a state of emergency, with a 301–76 vote in the lower house and a 147–32 vote in the upper house.
- July 30 – Typhoon Nina forms over the Philippine Sea.

=== August ===
- The first Cuban forces arrive in Angola to join Soviet personnel who are there to assist the MPLA that controls less than a quarter of Angolan territory. The United States, Zaire and Zambia request South Africa to provide training and support for the FNLA and UNITA forces.
- August 1 – The Helsinki Accords, which officially recognize Europe's national borders and respect for human rights, are signed in Finland.
- August 8 – The Banqiao Dam, in China's Henan Province, fails after Typhoon Nina; over 200,000 people perish.
- August 11 – Governor Mário Lemos Pires of Portuguese East Timor abandons the capital Dili, following a UDT coup and the outbreak of civil war between UDT and Fretilin.
- August 15
  - Founder President Sheikh Mujibur Rahman of Bangladesh is killed during a coup led by Major Syed Faruque Rahman.
  - Some members of Jehovah's Witnesses believe that Armageddon will occur this year based on the group's chronology and some sell their houses and businesses to prepare for the new world paradise which they believe will be created when Jesus establishes God's Kingdom on Earth.
- August 20 – Viking program: NASA launches the Viking 1 planetary probe toward Mars.
- August 24 – Officers responsible for the military coup in Greece in 1967 are sentenced to death in Athens. The sentences are later commuted to life imprisonment.
- August 25 – The Victoria Falls Conference between Rhodesian Prime Minister Ian Smith and the United African National Council is held in a South African Railways coach on the Victoria Falls Bridge, officiated by Zambian President Kenneth Kaunda and South African Prime Minister John Vorster.

=== September ===
- September–October – In New Zealand, Māori leader Whina Cooper leads a march of 5,000 people, in support of Maori claims to their land.
- September 5
  - In Sacramento, California, Lynette Fromme attempts to assassinate U.S. President Gerald Ford, but is thwarted by a Secret Service agent.
  - The London Hilton Hotel is bombed by the Provisional Irish Republican Army; two people are killed and 63 injured.
- September 6 – An earthquake of magnitude M_{s} 6.7 kills at least 2,085 in Diyarbakır and Lice, Turkey.
- September 14 – Rembrandt's painting The Night Watch is slashed a dozen times at the Rijksmuseum in Amsterdam.
- September 15 – The French department of Corse, comprising the entire island of Corsica, is divided into two departments: Haute-Corse (Upper Corsica) and Corse-du-Sud (Southern Corsica).

Flag of Papua New Guinea

- September 16
  - Papua New Guinea gains its independence from Australia.
  - Cape Verde, Mozambique and São Tomé and Príncipe join the United Nations.
- September 19 – General Vasco Gonçalves is ousted as Prime Minister of Portugal.
- September 20 – The term of Tuanku Al-Mutassimu Billahi Muhibbudin Sultan Abdul Halim Al-Muadzam Shah ibni Almarhum Sultan Badlishah, as the 5th Yang di-Pertuan Agong of Malaysia, ends.
- September 21 – Sultan Yahya Petra ibni Almarhum Sultan Ibrahim Petra of Kelantan, becomes the 6th Yang di-Pertuan Agong of Malaysia.
- September 22 – In San Francisco, Sara Jane Moore tries to assassinate U.S. President Ford, but is foiled by the Secret Service.
- September 27 – Francoist Spain executes five ETA and FRAP members, the last executions in Spain to date.
- September 30
  - The Hughes Helicopters (later McDonnell-Douglas and Boeing IDS) AH-64 Apache makes its first flight.
  - (US time) Home Box Office becomes the first pay television network to deliver a continuous signal via satellite by broadcasting the "Thrilla in Manila" boxing match live.

=== October ===
- October 1 – "Thrilla in Manila": Muhammad Ali defeats Joe Frazier in a boxing match in Manila, Philippines. The fight is viewed live by well over 100 million people worldwide.
- October 14
  - The South African Defence Force invades Angola during Operation Savannah in support of the FNLA and UNITA prior to the Angolan elections scheduled for November 11.
  - A British Royal Air Force Avro Vulcan bomber explodes and crashes over Żabbar, Malta after an aborted landing, killing five crew members and one person on the ground.
- October 16
  - The "Balibo Five", Australian television journalists are killed at Balibo by Indonesian Army special forces in the buildup to the Indonesian invasion of East Timor.
  - The last naturally occurring case of smallpox is diagnosed and treated, the victim being two-year-old Rahima Banu in Bangladesh.
- October 30 – Juan Carlos I of Spain becomes acting head of state after General Francisco Franco concedes that he is too ill to govern. His death on November 20 effectively marks the end of the dictatorship established following the Spanish Civil War and the beginning of the Spanish transition to democracy.
- October 31
  - The Racial Discrimination Act 1975 takes effect in Australia.
  - Tun Mustapha resigns as Chief Minister of Sabah, a state in Malaysia, bringing to an end speculation that he would attempt to lead secession for Sabah to become an independent nation.

=== November ===
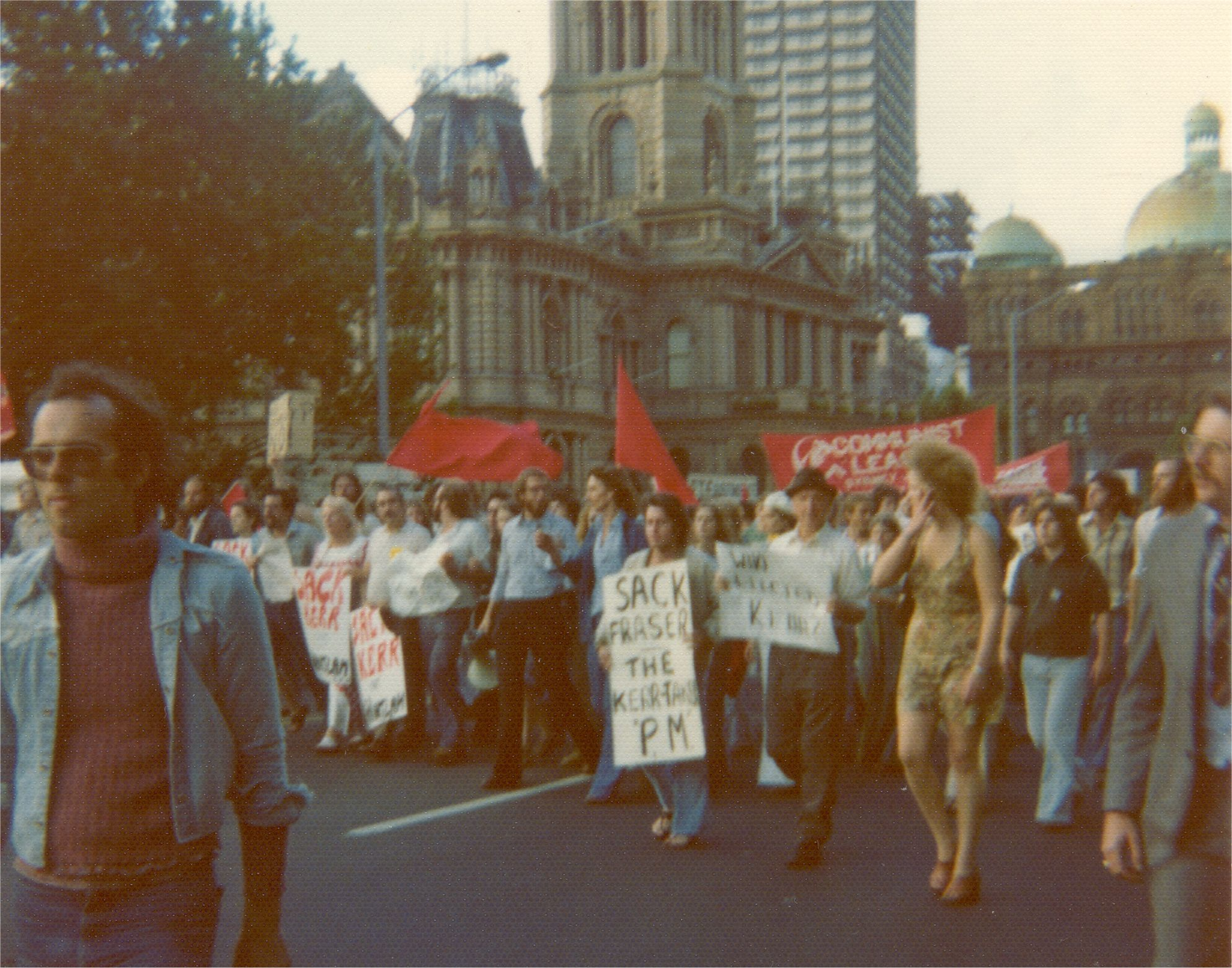
Protestors in Sydney immediately after the dismissal of Gough Whitlam, 11 November 1975

- November 6 – The Green March begins: 300,000 unarmed Moroccans converge on the southern city of Tarfaya and wait for a signal from King Hassan II of Morocco to cross into Western Sahara.
- November 7 – A vapor cloud explosion at a petroleum cracking facility in Geleen, Netherlands, leaves 14 dead and 109 injured, with fires lasting for five days.
- November 10
  - United Nations General Assembly Resolution 3379: By a vote of 72–35 (with 32 abstentions), the United Nations General Assembly approves a resolution equating Zionism with racism. The resolution provokes an outcry among Zionists. It is repealed in 1991.
  - The Treaty of Osimo is signed between Italy and Yugoslavia, resolving their dispute over Trieste. Under the agreement, a majority of the land area and residents go to Italy.
  - The 729-foot (222 m)-long freighter SS Edmund Fitzgerald sinks during a storm 27 kilometres (17 mi) from the entrance to Whitefish Bay on Lake Superior, killing all 29 crew members on board (an event immortalized in song by Gordon Lightfoot).
  - Lev Leshchenko revives "Den Pobedy", one of the most popular World War II songs in the Soviet Union.
- November 11
  - Angola becomes independent from Portugal and civil war erupts.
    Flag of Angola
  - Australian constitutional crisis of 1975: Governor-General of Australia Sir John Kerr controversially dismisses the Whitlam Labor government and commissions Malcolm Fraser of the Liberal/National Country Coalition as caretaker Prime Minister.
  - The first annual Vogalonga rowing "race" is held in Venice, Italy.
- November 12 – The Comoros joins the United Nations.
- November 14 – Madrid Accords: Spain agrees to hand over power of the Spanish Sahara to Morocco and Mauritania by the end of February 1976.
- November 15 – The "Group of 6" industrialized nations (G-6) is formed and holds its 1st summit at the Château de Rambouillet in France.
- November 16 – Beginning of the Third Cod War between UK and Iceland, which lasts until June 1976.
- November 19 – The United States Congress approves the Clark Amendment, ending aid to the FNLA and UNITA.
- November 22 – Juan Carlos is declared King of Spain following the death of General Francisco Franco; he will reign until his abdication in 2014.

Flag of Suriname

- November 25
  - Suriname gains independence from the Kingdom of the Netherlands.
  - A failed military coup d'état by far-left activists occurs in Portugal.
- November 28
  - Portuguese Timor declares its independence from Portugal as East Timor.
  - South African Navy frigates evacuate 26 SADF members from behind enemy lines at Ambrizete, 160 kilometres (99 mi) north of Luanda in Angola.
- November 29
  - While disabled, the submarine tender USS Proteus discharges radioactive coolant water into Apra Harbor, Guam. A Geiger counter at two of the harbor's public beaches shows 100 millirems/hour, 50 times the allowable dose.
  - 1975 New Zealand general election: The New Zealand National Party led by Robert Muldoon defeats the incumbent New Zealand Labour Party led by Prime Minister Bill Rowling.

=== December ===
- December 2 – In Laos, the Second Indochina War ends, when the communist party of the Pathet Lao takes over Vientiane and defeats the Kingdom of Laos, forcing King Sisavang Vatthana to abdicate and creating the Lao People's Democratic Republic. This ends the Laotian Civil War, with mass evacuation of American troops and Laotian civilians, but effectively begins the Insurgency in Laos with the Pathet Lao fighting the Hmong people, Royalist-in-exile and the Right-wings.
- December 3 – Wreck of HMHS Britannic (sunk by mine 1916) is found in the Kea Channel by Jacques Cousteau.
- December 7 – Indonesian invasion of East Timor: Indonesia invades East Timor; the occupation continues until 1999 when U.N. peacekeepers take control, which they did until 2002.
- December 13
  - 1975 Australian federal election: The Liberal/National Country Coalition led by Malcolm Fraser defeats the recently dismissed Labor government led by Gough Whitlam. The Fraser government achieves what is so far the largest parliamentary majority in federal Australian political history. Whitlam would subsequently survive a leadership challenge against him.
  - The United Nations Convention on the Reduction of Statelessness (1961) comes into effect.
- December 18 – The Algerian president Houari Boumediene orders the expulsion of all Moroccans from Algeria.
- December 21 – Six people, including Carlos the Jackal, kidnap delegates of an OPEC conference in Vienna.
- December 29 – A bomb explosion at LaGuardia Airport in New York City kills 11 people.

=== Date unknown ===
- The Spanish Army quits Spanish Sahara (modern-day Western Sahara), last remnant of the Spanish Empire. The Sahrawi Republic (RASD) is created. Morocco invades the former territory.
- Benoit Mandelbrot coins the mathematical term fractal.
- Victoria (Australia) abolishes capital punishment.
- South Australia becomes the first Australian state to decriminalize homosexual acts between consenting adults.

=== World population ===
World population
| | 1975 | 1970 | | 1980 | |
|---|---|---|---|---|---|
| World | 4,068,109,000 | 3,692,492,000 | 375,617,000 | 4,434,682,000 | 366,573,000 |
| Africa | 408,160,000 | 357,283,000 | 50,877,000 | 469,618,001 | 61,458,000 |
| Asia | 2,397,512,000 | 2,143,118,000 | 254,394,000 | 2,632,335,000 | 234,823,000 |
| Europe | 675,542,000 | 655,855,000 | 19,687,000 | 692,431,000 | 16,889,000 |
| South America | 321,906,000 | 284,856,000 | 37,050,000 | 361,401,000 | 39,495,000 |
| North America | 243,425,000 | 231,937,000 | 11,488,000 | 256,068,000 | 12,643,000 |
| Oceania | 21,564,000 | 19,443,000 | 2,121,000 | 22,828,000 | 1,264,000 |

== Births ==
=== January ===
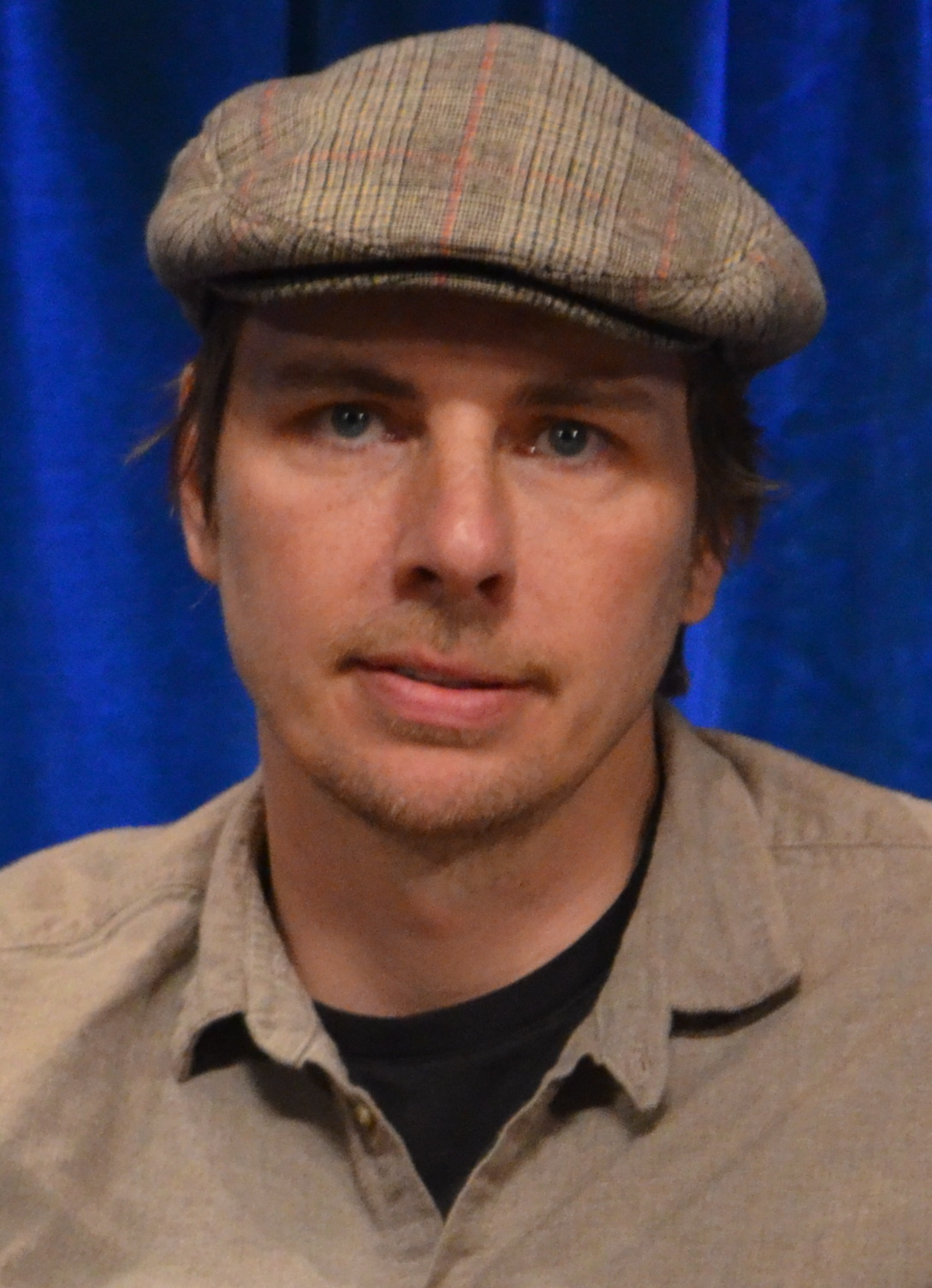
Dax Shepard

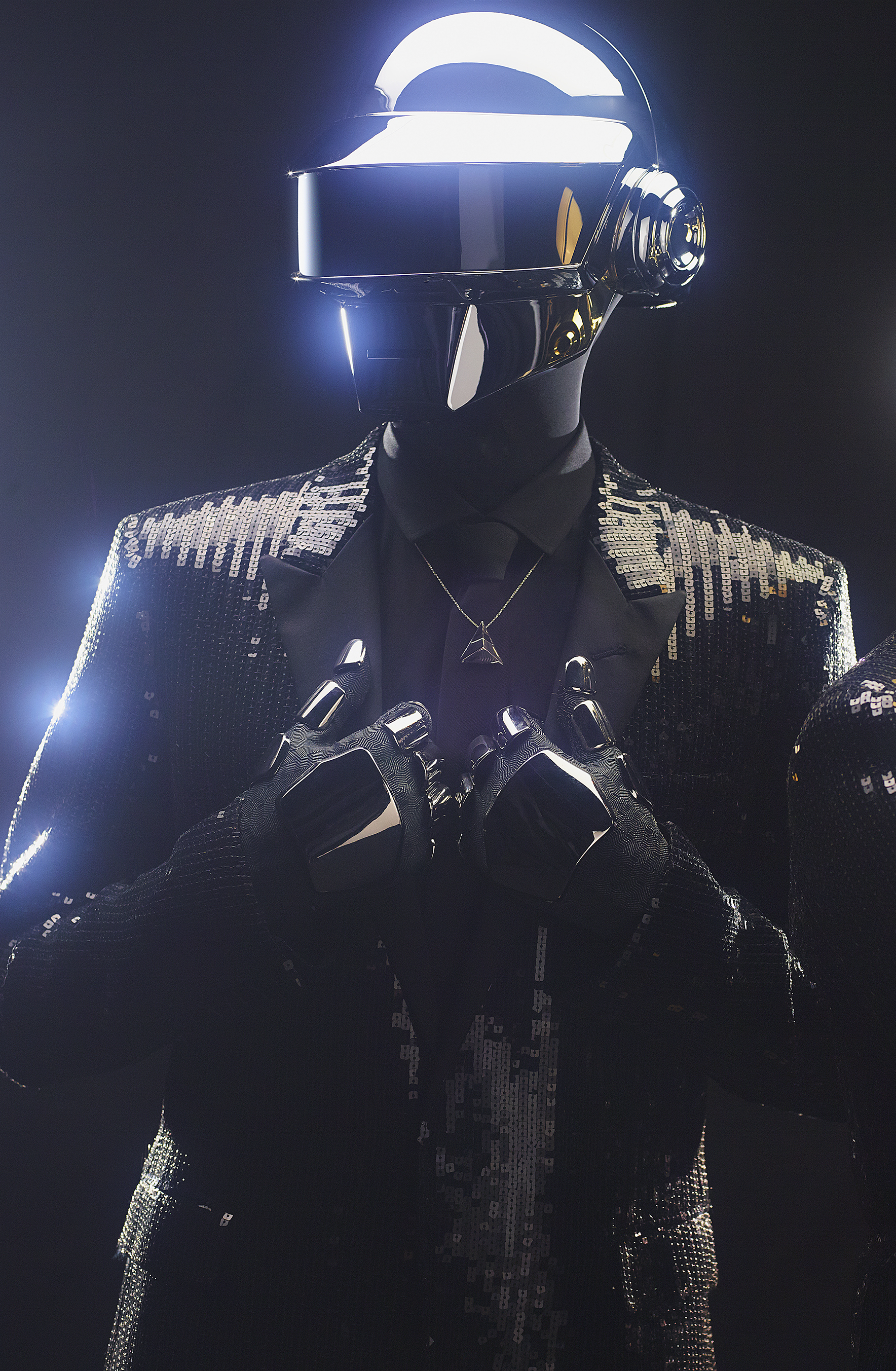
Thomas Bangalter

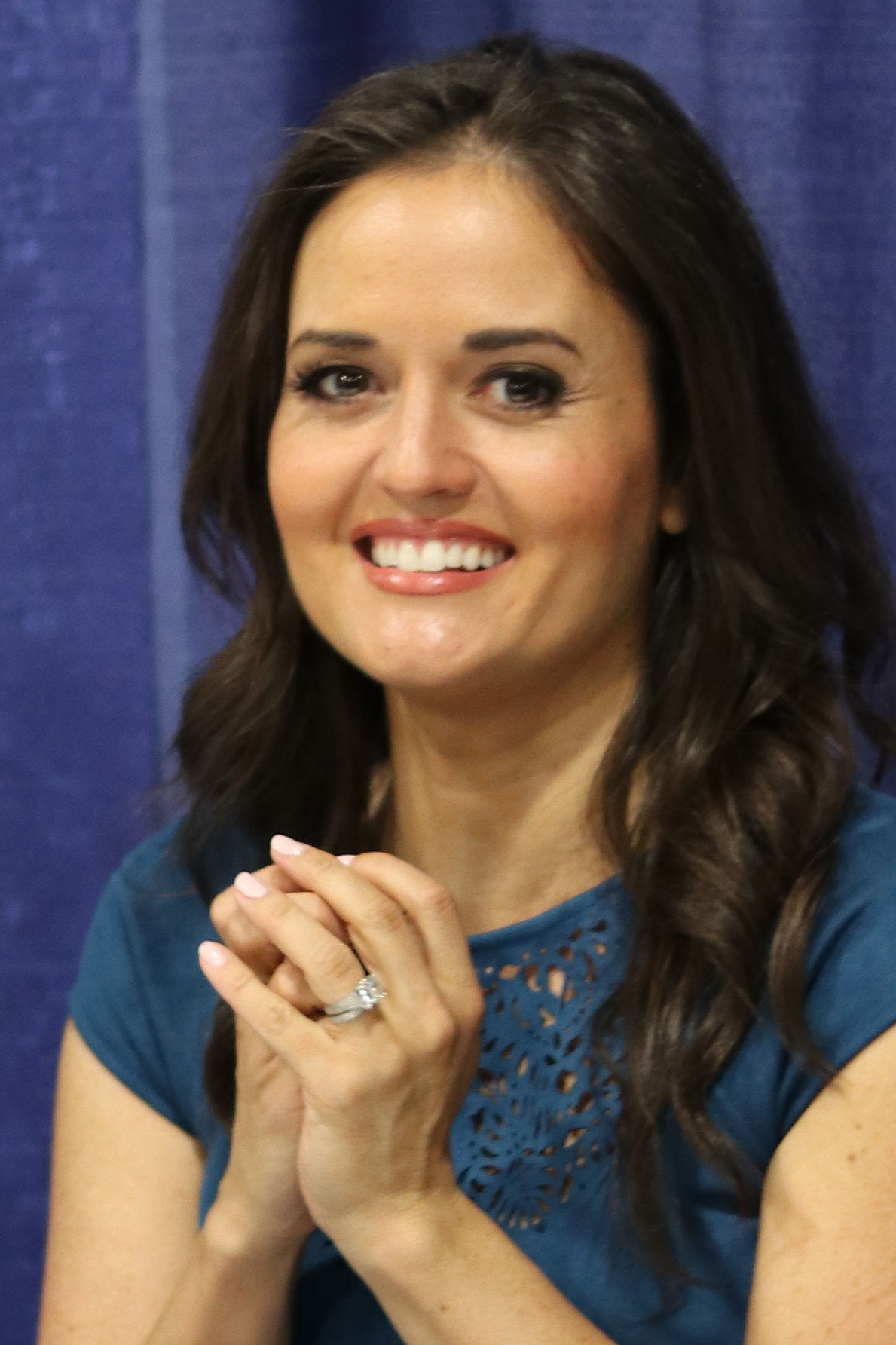
Danica McKellar

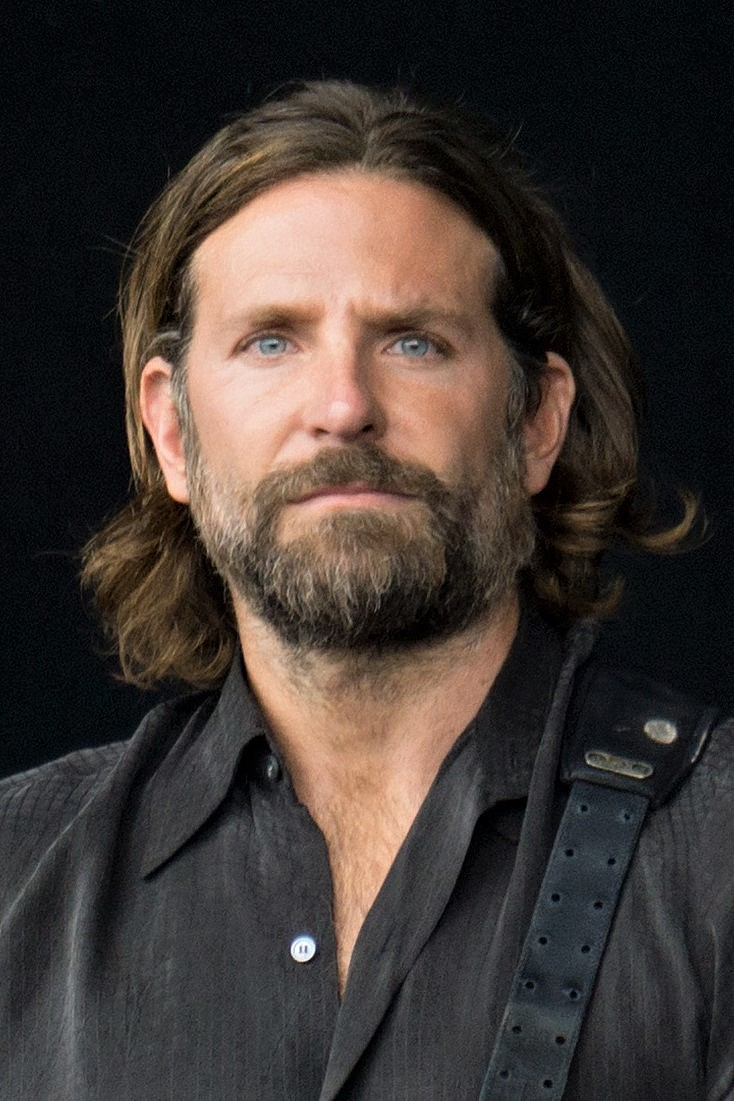
Bradley Cooper

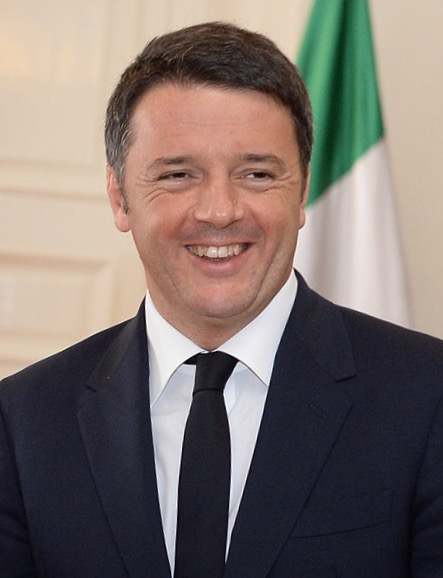
Matteo Renzi

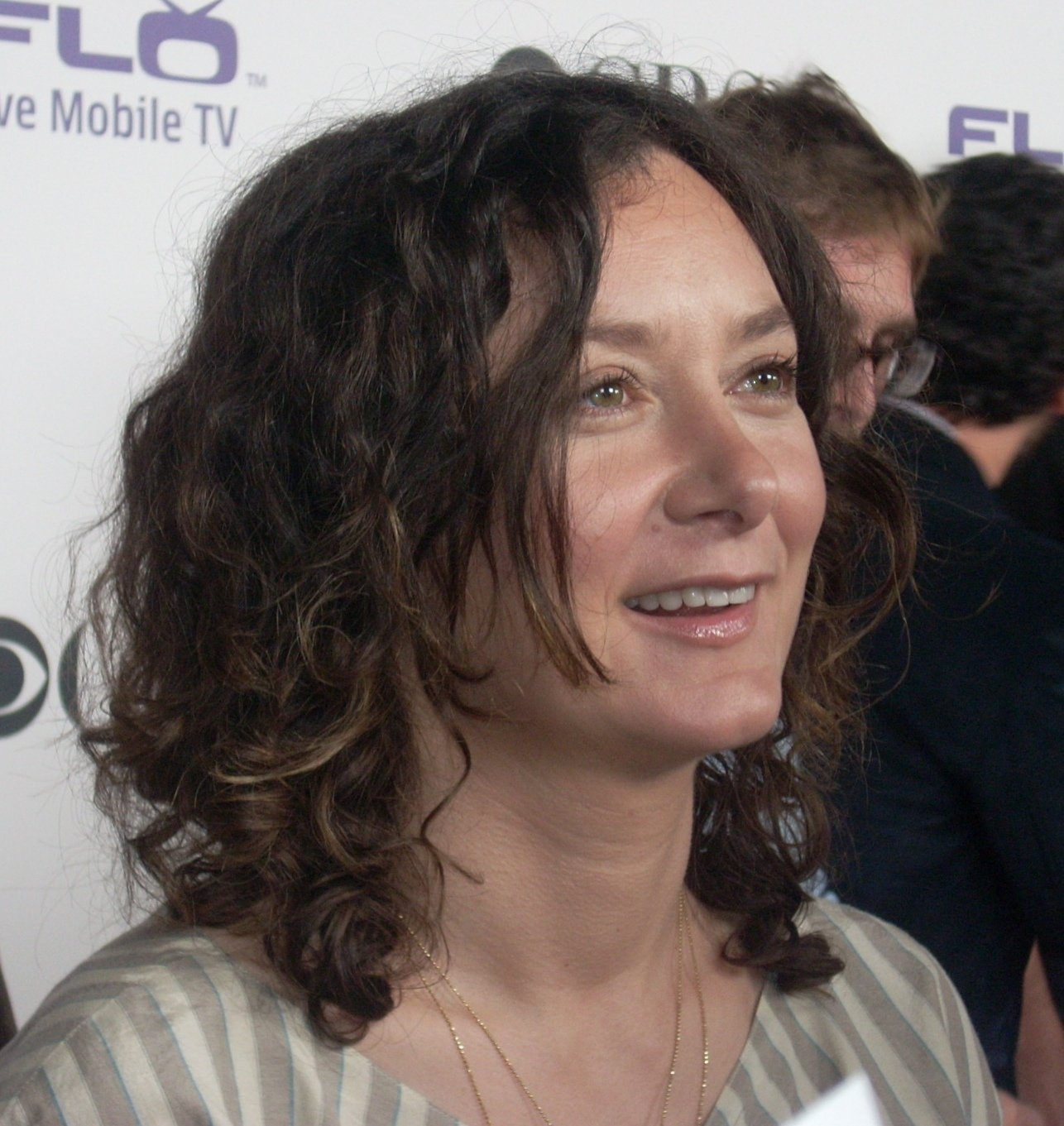
Sara Gilbert

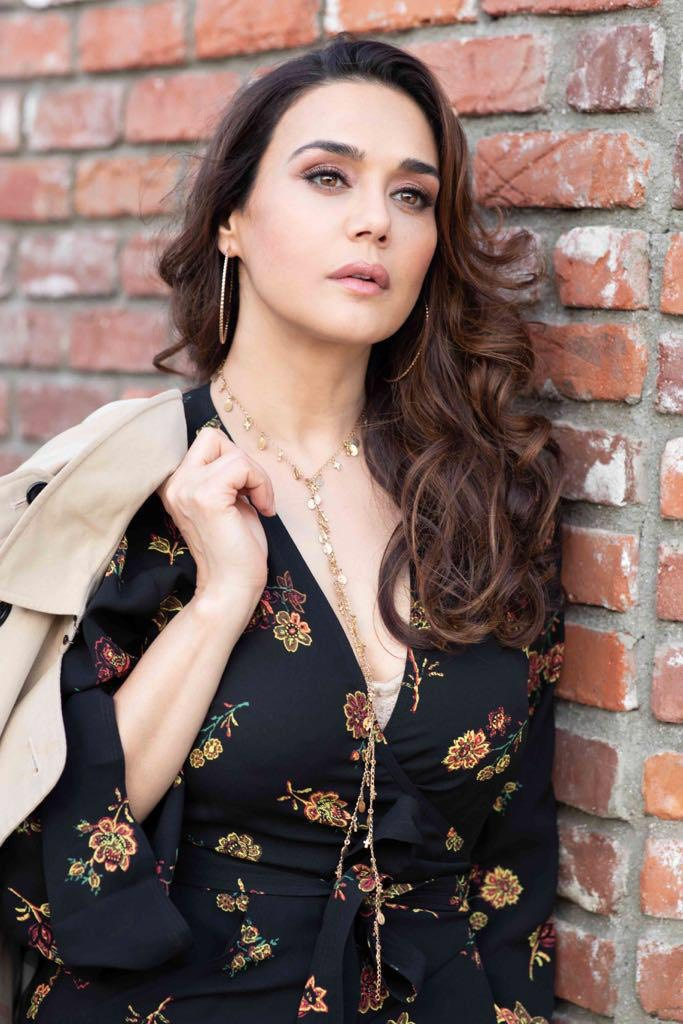
Preity Zinta

- January 1
  - Sonali Bendre, Indian actress
  - Eiichiro Oda, Japanese manga artist
- January 2
  - Dax Shepard, American actor
  - Oleksandr Shovkovskyi, Ukrainian footballer
  - Vladyslav Vashchuk, Ukrainian footballer
- January 3
  - Danica McKellar, American actress and education advocate
  - Thomas Bangalter, French musician and record producer
- January 5 – Bradley Cooper, American actor
- January 6
  - Laura Berg, American softball player and coach
  - Ricardo Santos, Brazilian beach volleyball player
- January 11 – Matteo Renzi, 56th Prime Minister of Italy
- January 15 – Mary Pierce, French tennis player
- January 23 – Tito Ortiz, American mixed martial arts fighter
- January 25
  - Mia Kirshner, Canadian actress
  - Tim Montgomery, American athlete
- January 29 – Sara Gilbert, American actress
- January 30 – Juninho Pernambucano, Brazilian footballer
- January 31 – Preity Zinta, Indian actress and entrepreneur

=== February ===
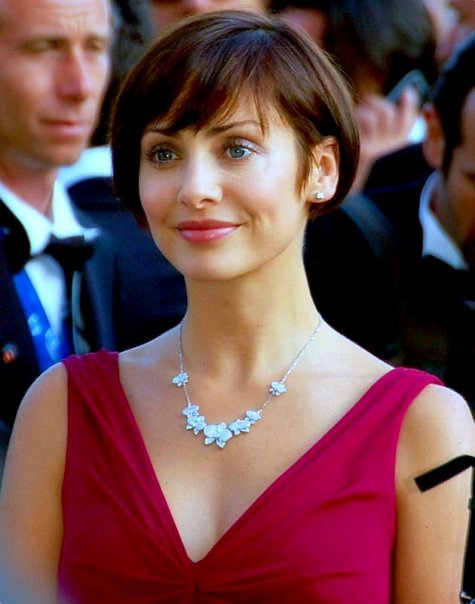
Natalie Imbruglia

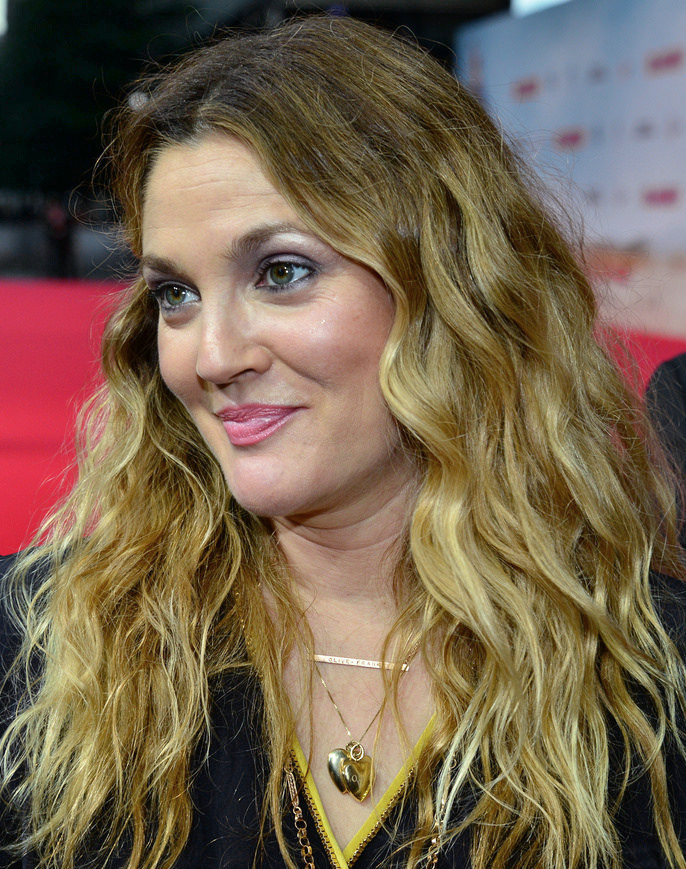
Drew Barrymore

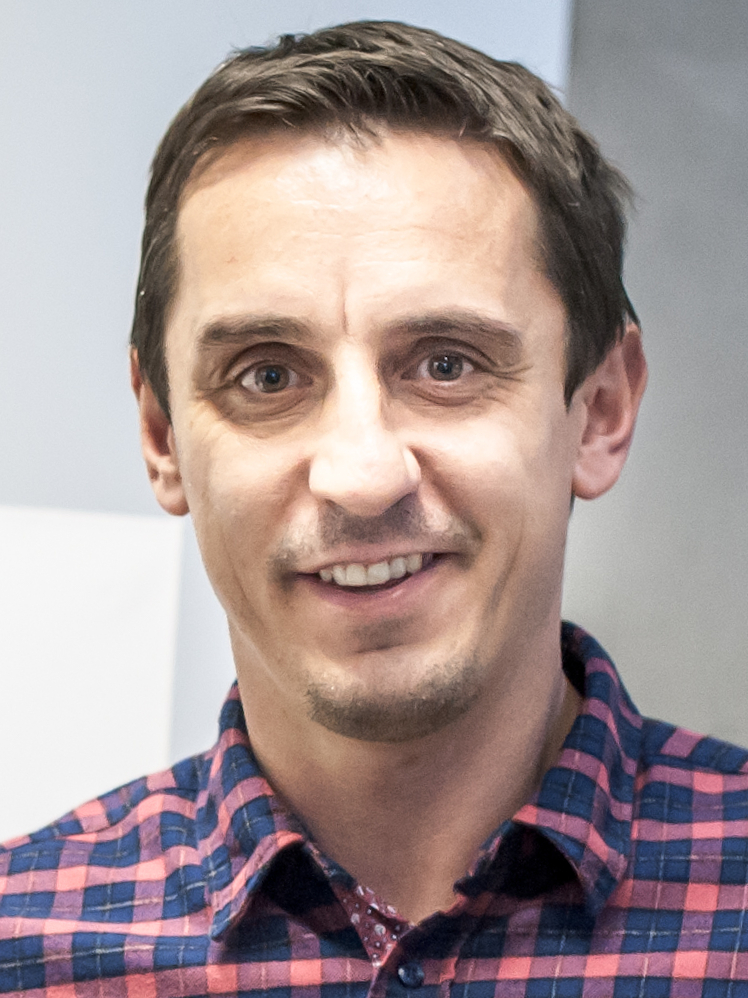
Gary Neville

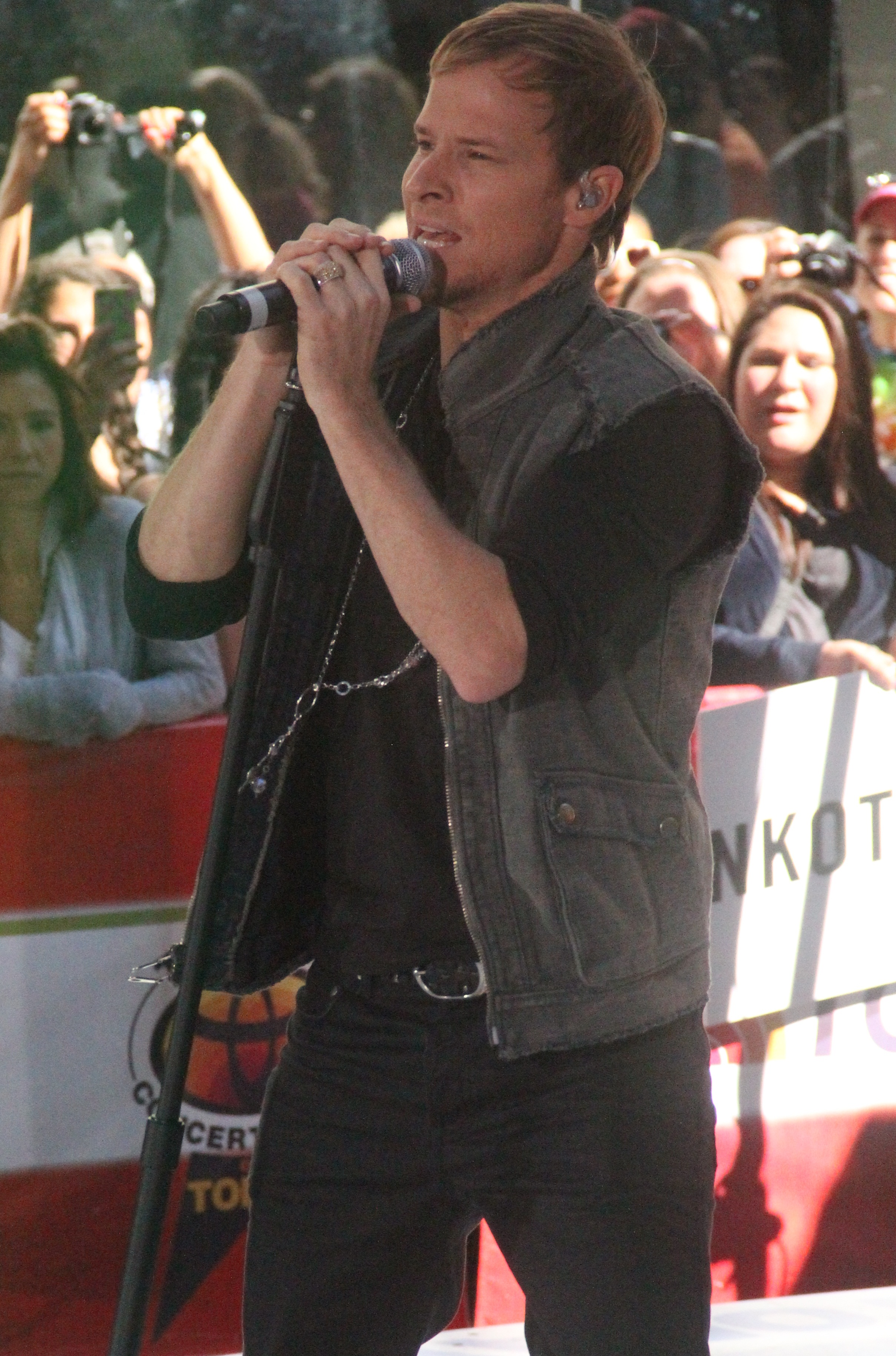
Brian Littrell

- February 2 – Ieroklis Stoltidis, Greek footballer
- February 3 – Brad Thorn, New Zealand-Australian rugby player
- February 4 – Natalie Imbruglia, Australian actress and singer
- February 5 – Giovanni van Bronckhorst, Dutch footballer and coach
- February 9 – Vladimir Guerrero, Dominican baseball player
- February 10 – Hiroki Kuroda, Japanese baseball pitcher
- February 14 – Malik Zidi, French actor
- February 17
  - Harisu, South Korean singer, model and actress
  - Kaspars Astašenko, Latvian ice hockey player (d. 2012)
  - Václav Prospal, Czech hockey player
- February 18
  - Igor Dodon, President of Moldova
  - Keith Gillespie, Northern Irish footballer
  - Gary Neville, English footballer
- February 20 – Brian Littrell, American pop singer
- February 22 – Drew Barrymore, American actress and film producer
- February 23
  - Wilfred Kibet Kigen, Kenyan long-distance runner
  - Callan Mulvey, New Zealand-born Australian actor
- February 25 – Chelsea Handler, American comedian and television host

=== March ===
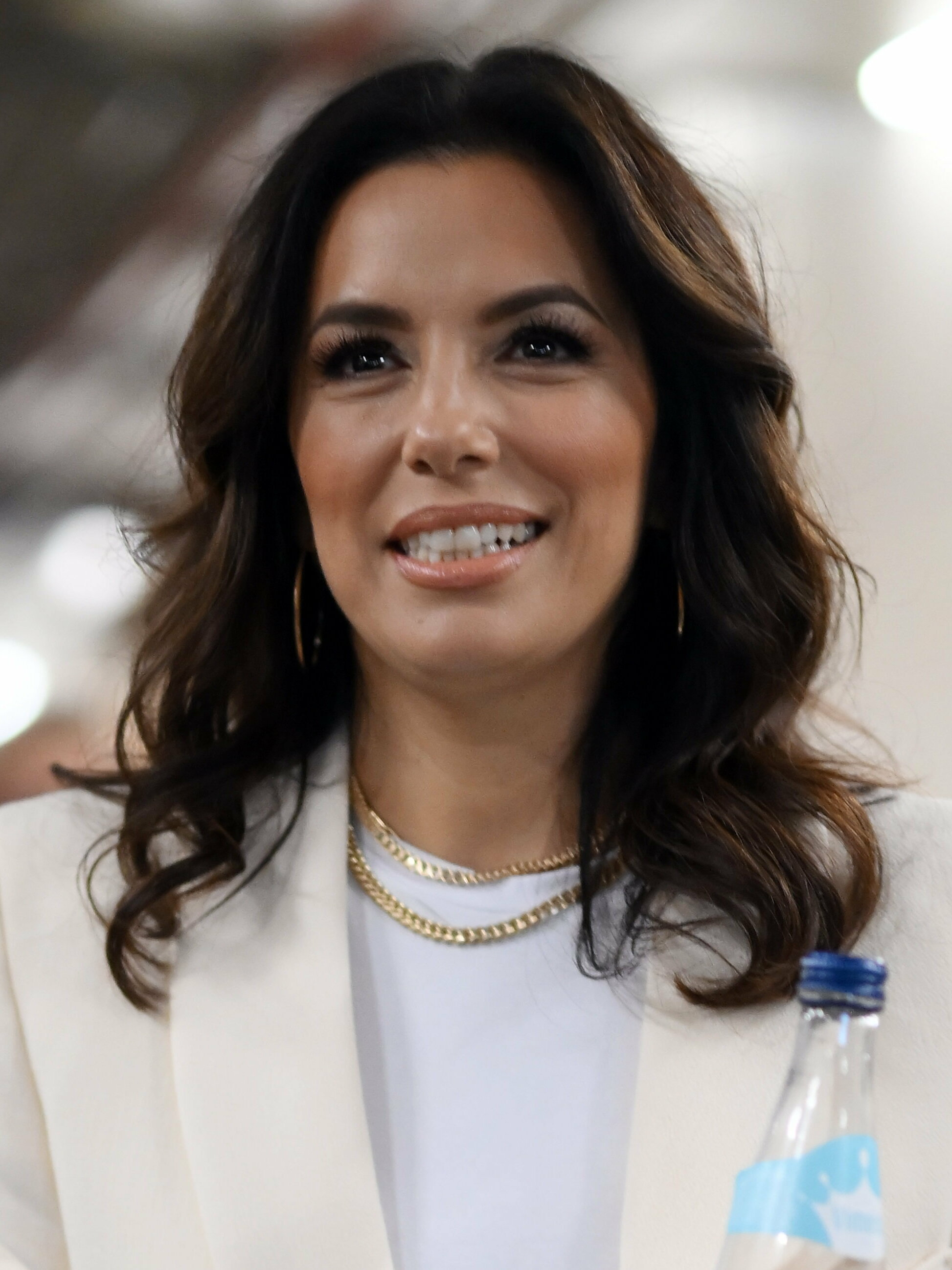
Eva Longoria

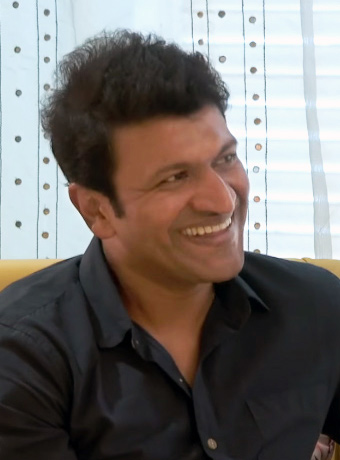
Puneeth Rajkumar

- March 1 – Valentina Monetta, Sammarinese singer
- March 5 – Jolene Blalock, American actress
- March 6 – Aracely Arámbula, Mexican actress, singer and model
- March 9
  - Roy Makaay, Dutch footballer
  - Lisa Miskovsky, Swedish musician
  - Juan Sebastián Verón, Argentine footballer
- March 10 – Jamie Arnold, American-Israeli basketball player
- March 11
  - Buvaisar Saitiev, Chechen wrestler
  - David Cañada, Spanish cyclist (d. 2016)
- March 15
  - Eva Longoria, American actress
  - Veselin Topalov, Bulgarian chess player
  - will.i.am, American rapper and singer
- March 17
  - Puneeth Rajkumar, Indian actor (d. 2021)
  - Test, Canadian professional wrestler (d. 2009)
  - Natalie Zea, American actress
- March 18 – Sutton Foster, American actress
- March 19
  - Vivian Hsu, Taiwanese singer, actress and model
  - Le Jingyi, Chinese swimmer
- March 21
  - Fabricio Oberto, Argentinian-Italian basketball player
  - Mark Williams, Welsh professional snooker player
- March 22 – Guillermo Díaz, American actor
- March 24
  - Thomas Johansson, Swedish tennis player
  - Albin Kurti, prime minister of Kosovo
- March 25
  - Ladislav Benýšek, Czech ice hockey player
  - Melanie Blatt, English singer
- March 27
  - Fergie, American singer and actress
  - Mihaela Melinte, Romanian hammer thrower
- March 28 – Iván Helguera, Spanish footballer
- March 29 – Jan Bos, Dutch speed skater
- March 31 – Mirtha Vásquez, Peruvian politician and lawyer, Prime Minister of Peru

=== April ===
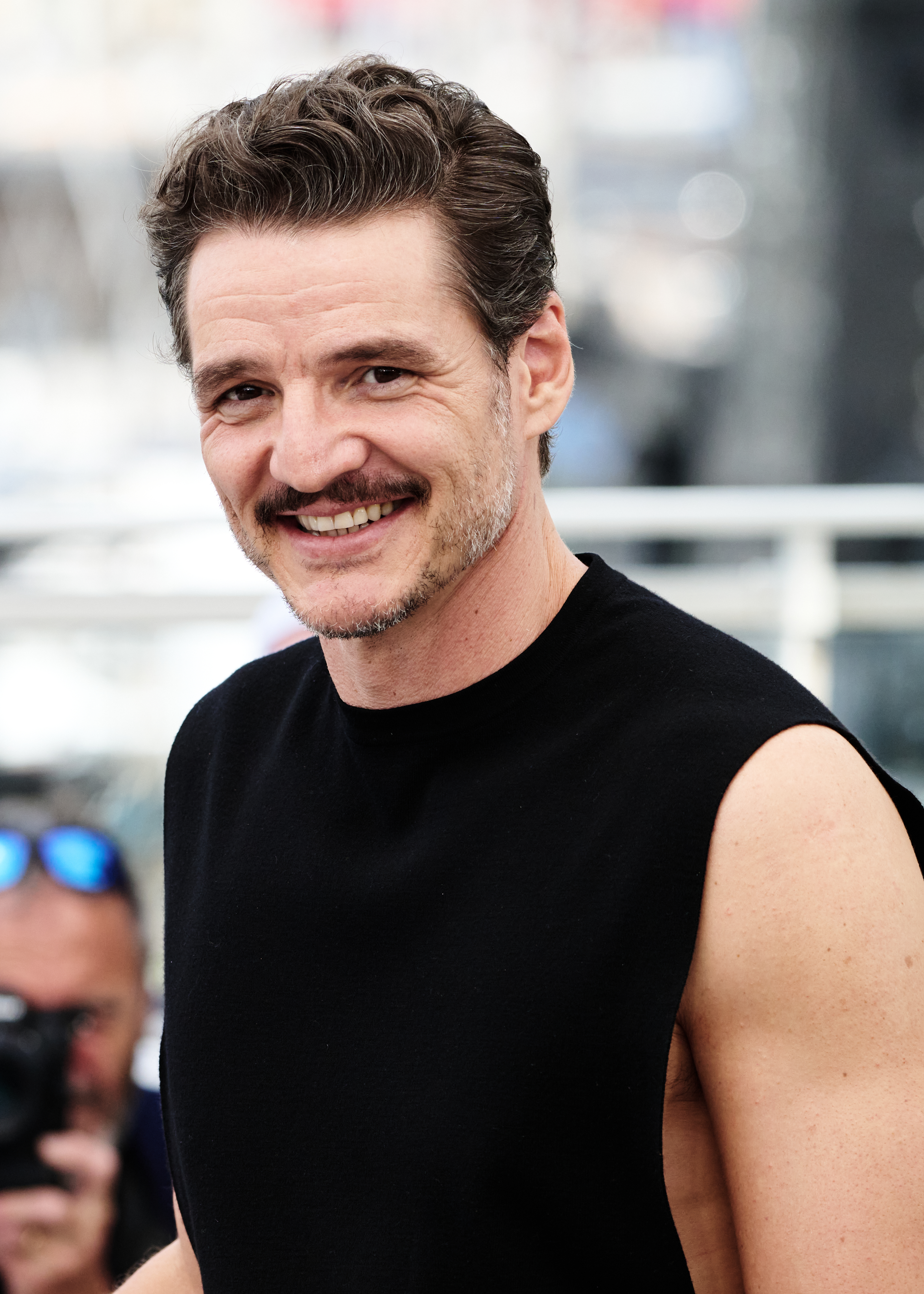
Pedro Pascal

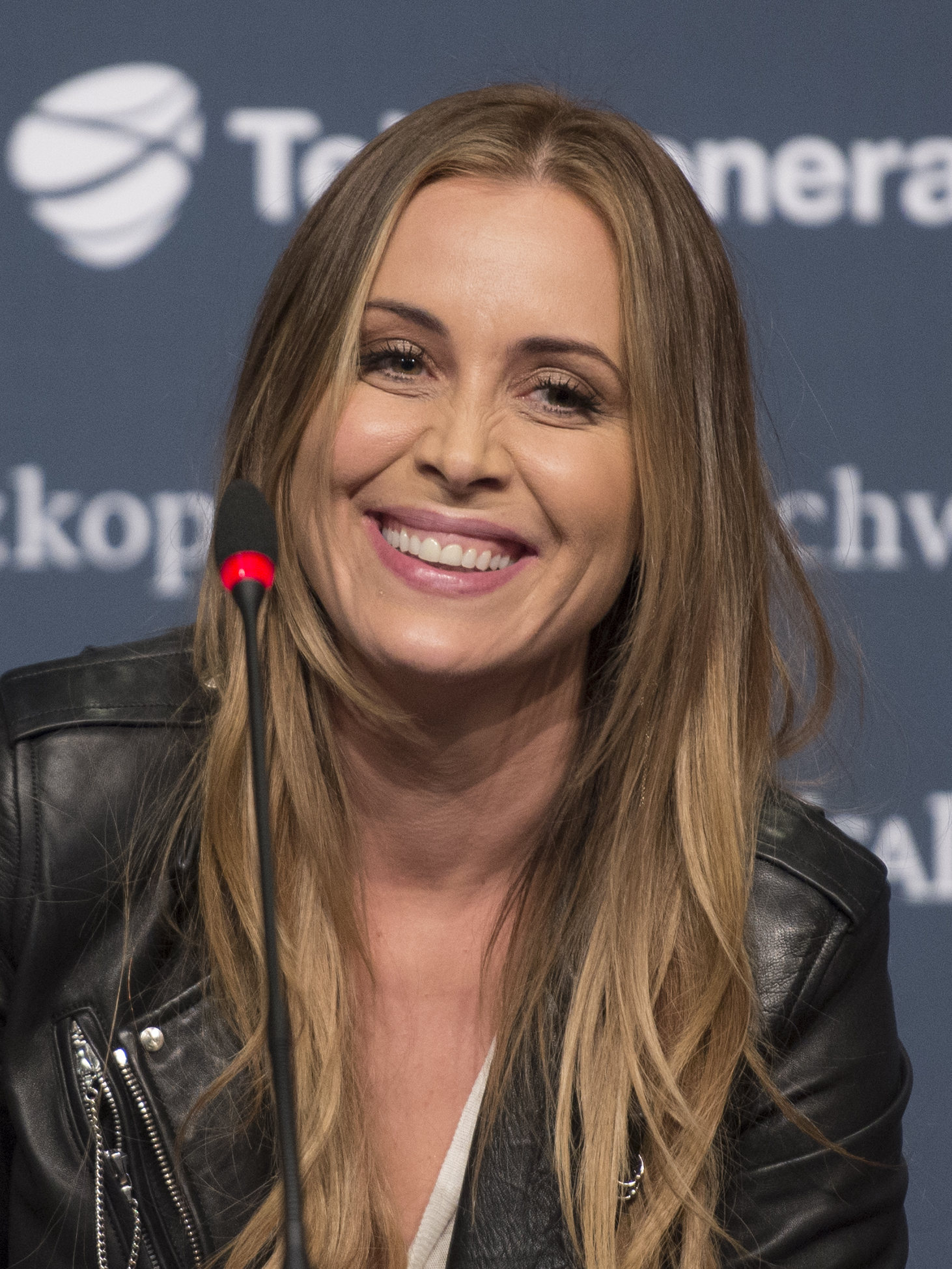
Anouk

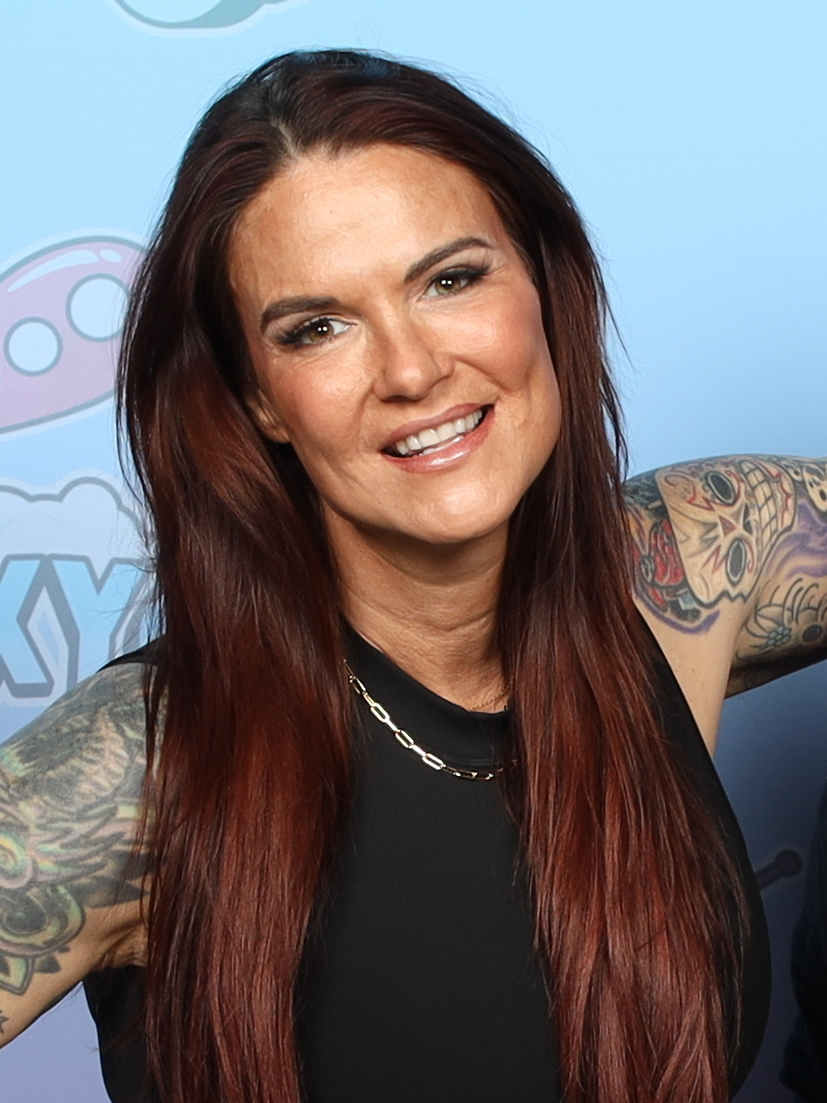
Lita

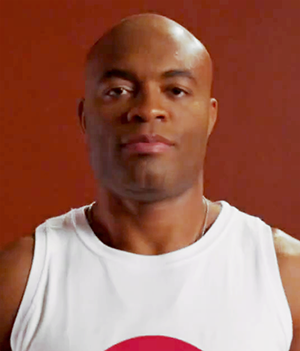
Anderson Silva

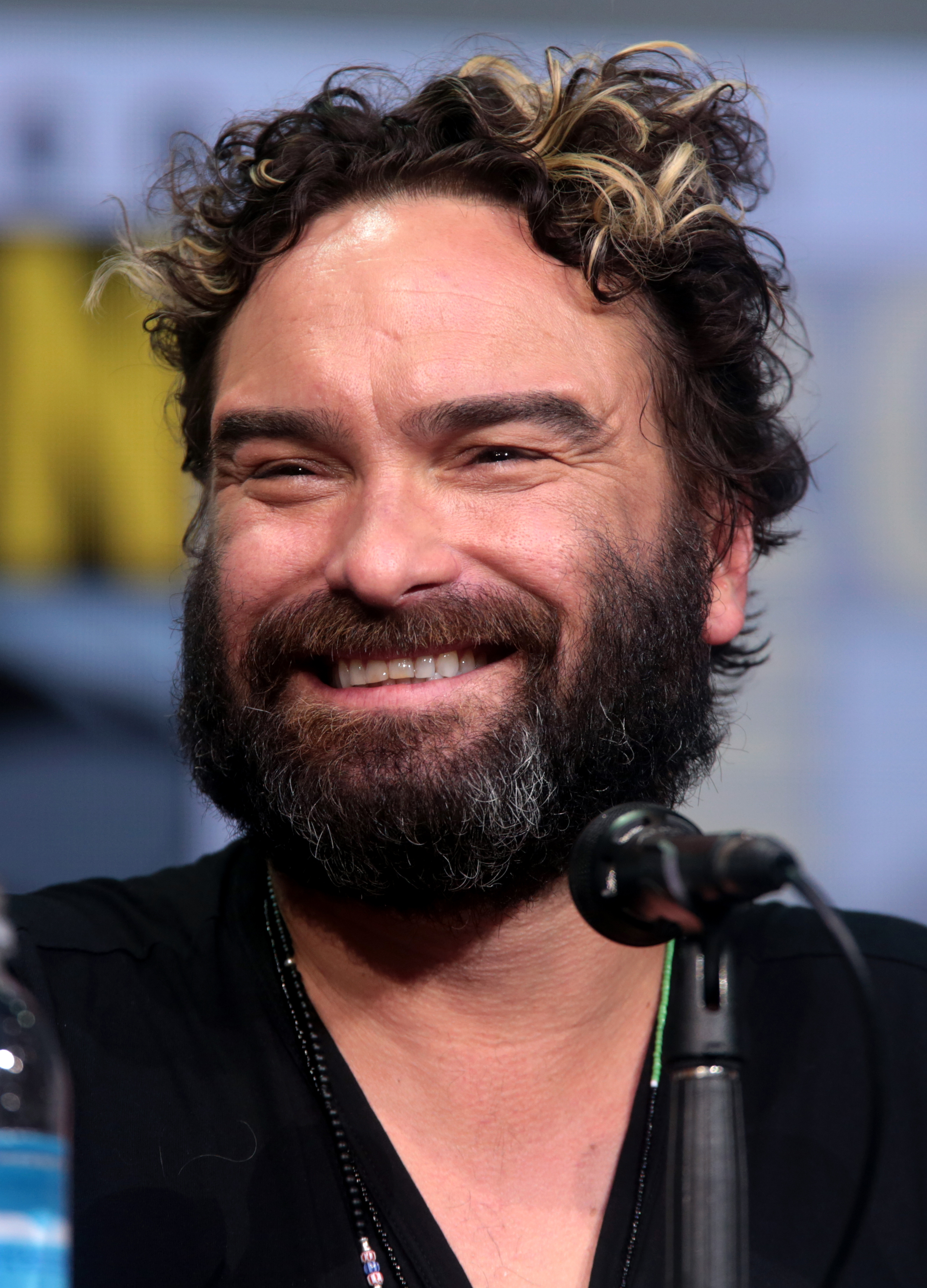
Johnny Galecki

- April 1
  - Magdalena Maleeva, Bulgarian tennis player
  - Kristine Quance, American swimmer
- April 2
  - Nate Huffman, American basketball player (d. 2015)
  - Pedro Pascal, Chilean-American actor
  - Adam Rodriguez, American actor
- April 3 – Koji Uehara, Japanese baseball pitcher
- April 5
  - John Hartson, Welsh footballer
  - Juicy J, American rapper, songwriter, and record producer
- April 6
  - Zach Braff, American actor
  - Sónia Lopes, Cape Verdean runner
- April 8 – Anouk, Dutch singer-songwriter and producer
- April 9 – Robbie Fowler, English footballer
- April 10 - David Harbour, American actor
- April 13
  - Jasey-Jay Anderson, Canadian snowboarder
  - Tatiana Navka, Ukrainian born-Russian Ice dancer
- April 14
  - Lita, American professional wrestler
  - Anderson Silva, Brazilian UFC fighter
- April 19 – Jussi Jääskeläinen, Finnish football player and coach
- April 21 – Danyon Loader, New Zealand swimmer
- April 22
  - Greg Moore, Canadian racing driver (d. 1999)
  - Carlos Sastre, Spanish road bicycle racer
- April 26 – Joey Jordison, American metal drummer for Slipknot (d. 2021)
- April 27 – Kazuyoshi Funaki, Japanese ski jumper
- April 30 – Johnny Galecki, Belgian-born American actor

=== May ===
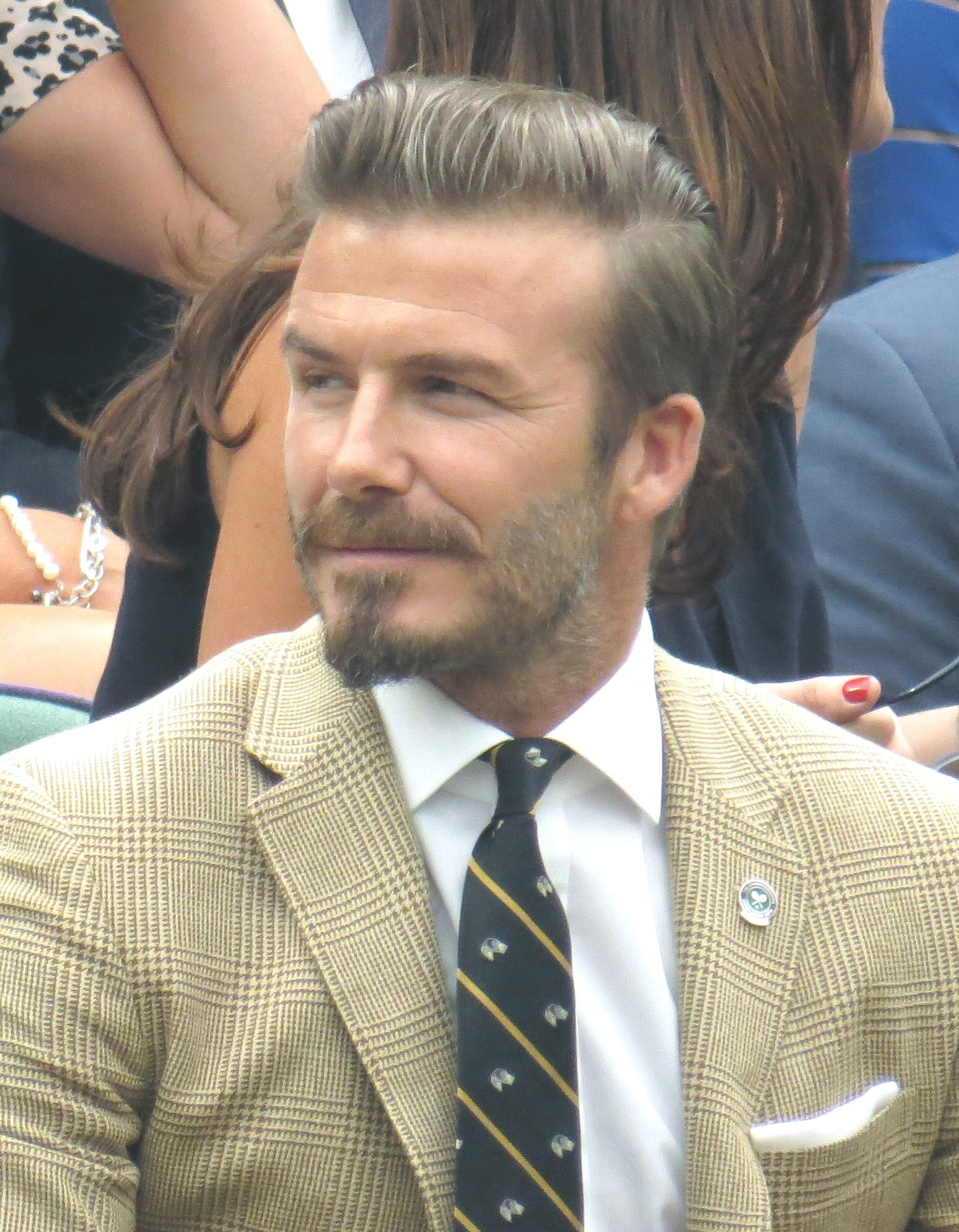
David Beckham

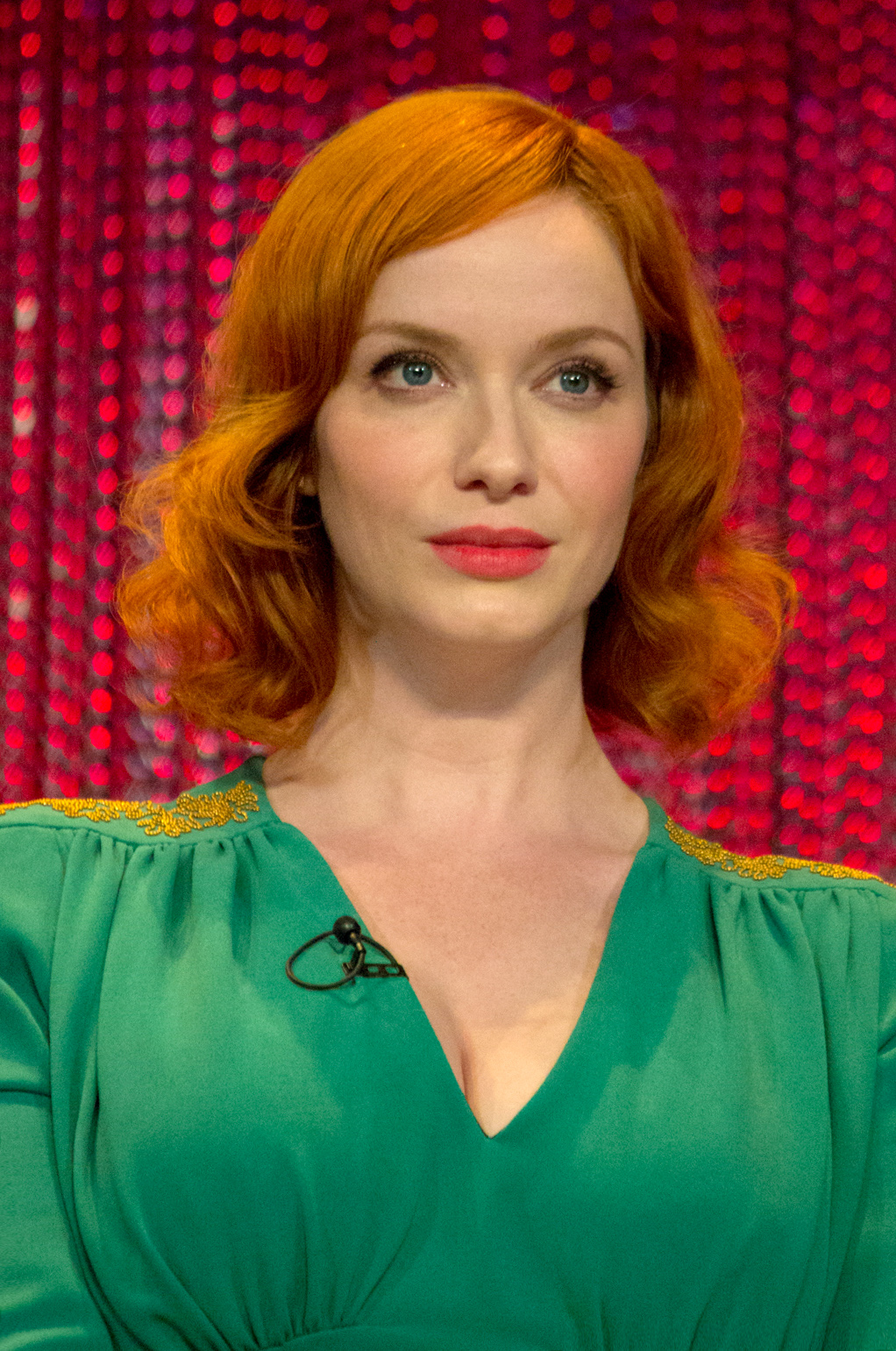
Christina Hendricks

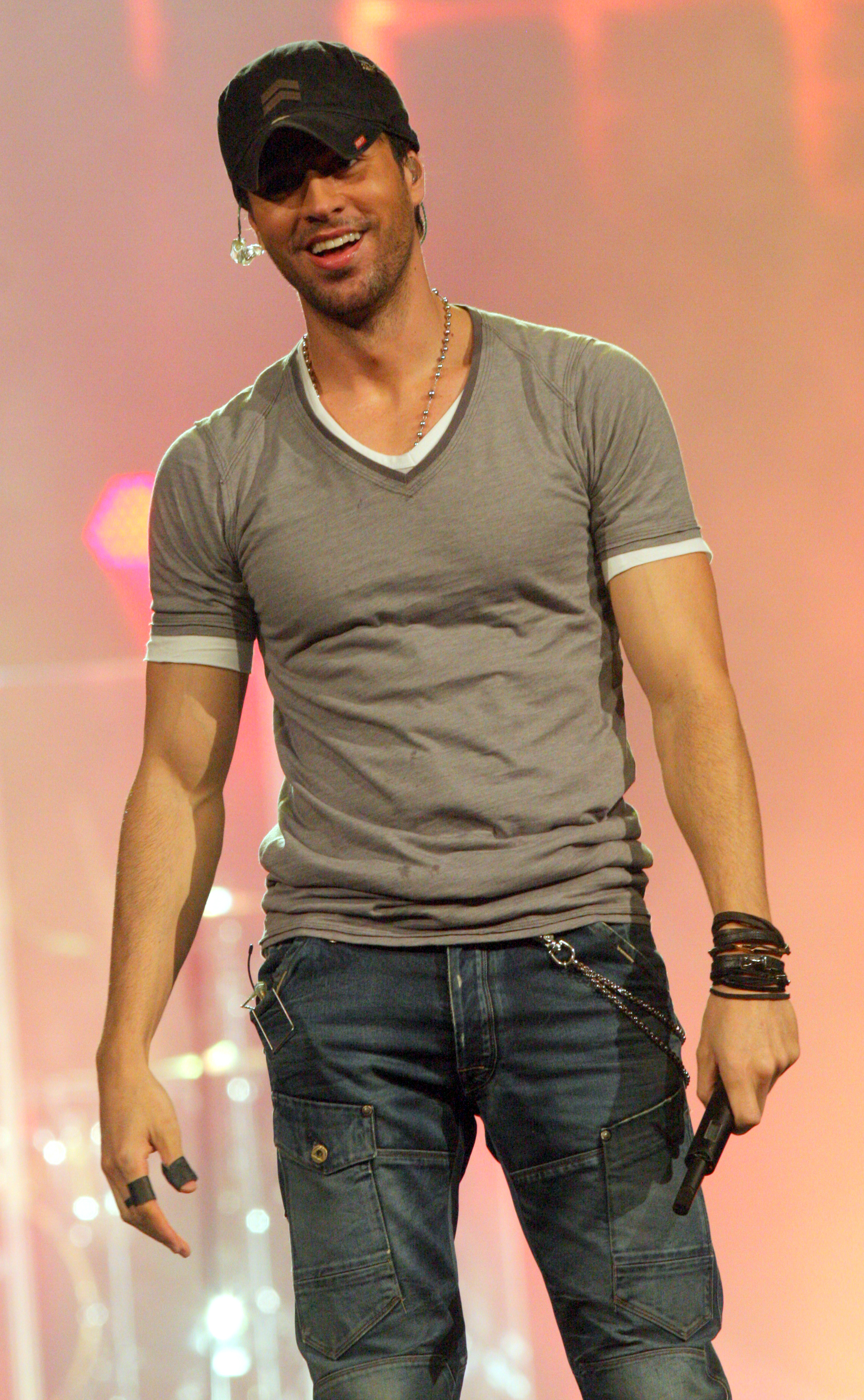
Enrique Iglesias

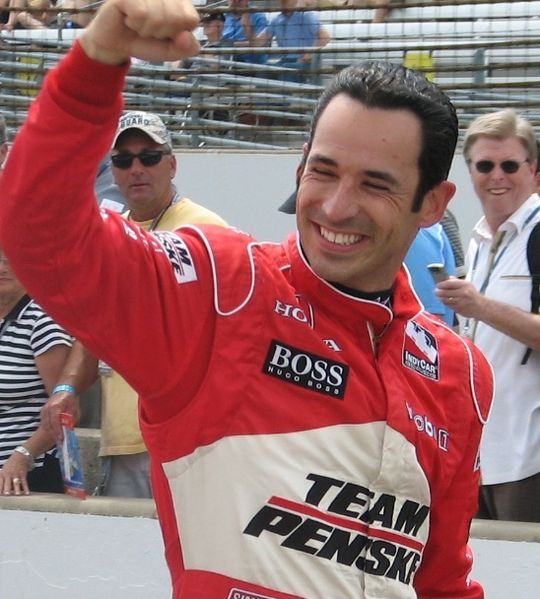
Hélio Castroneves

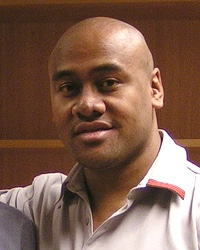
Jonah Lomu

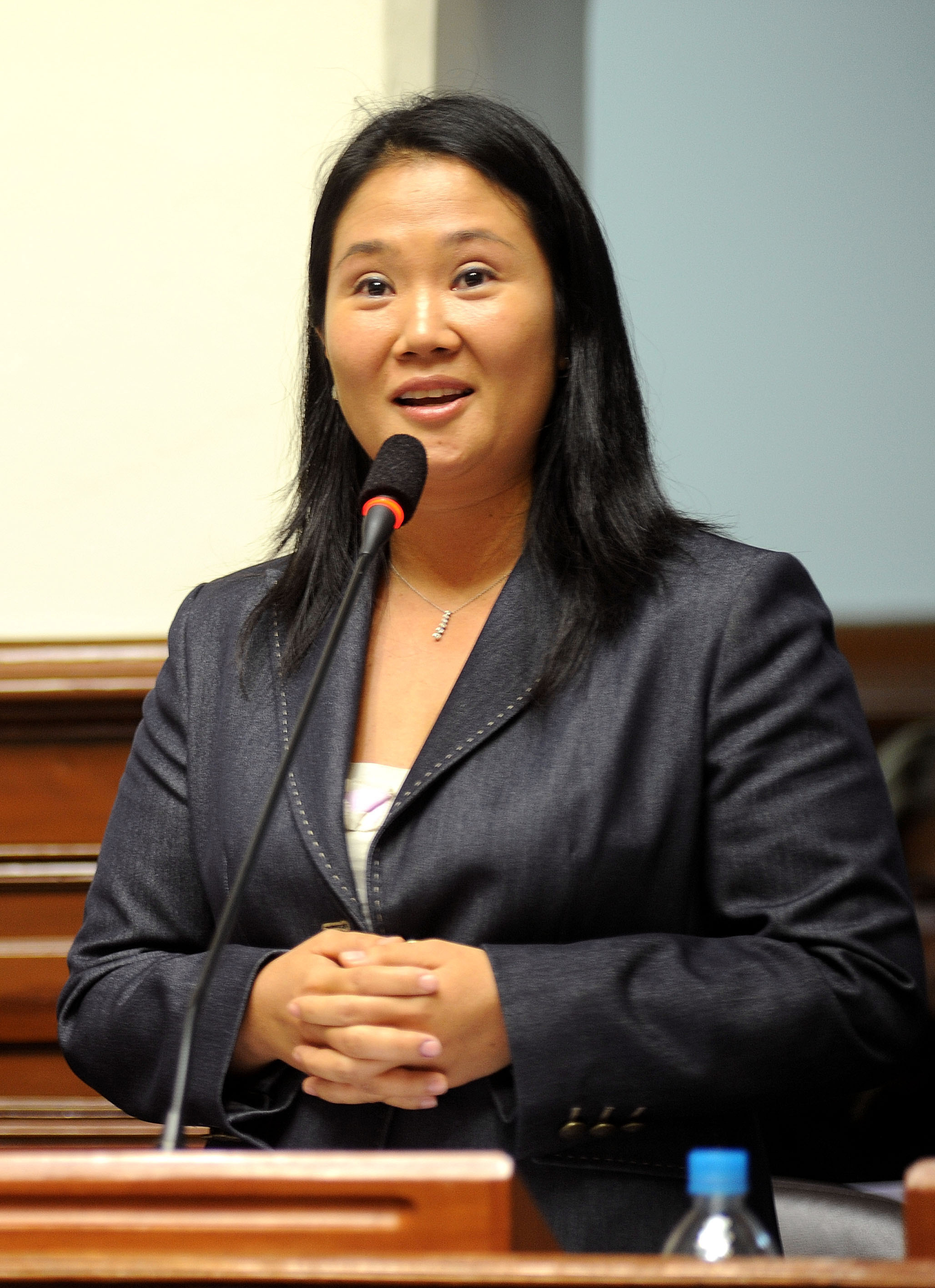
Keiko Fujimori

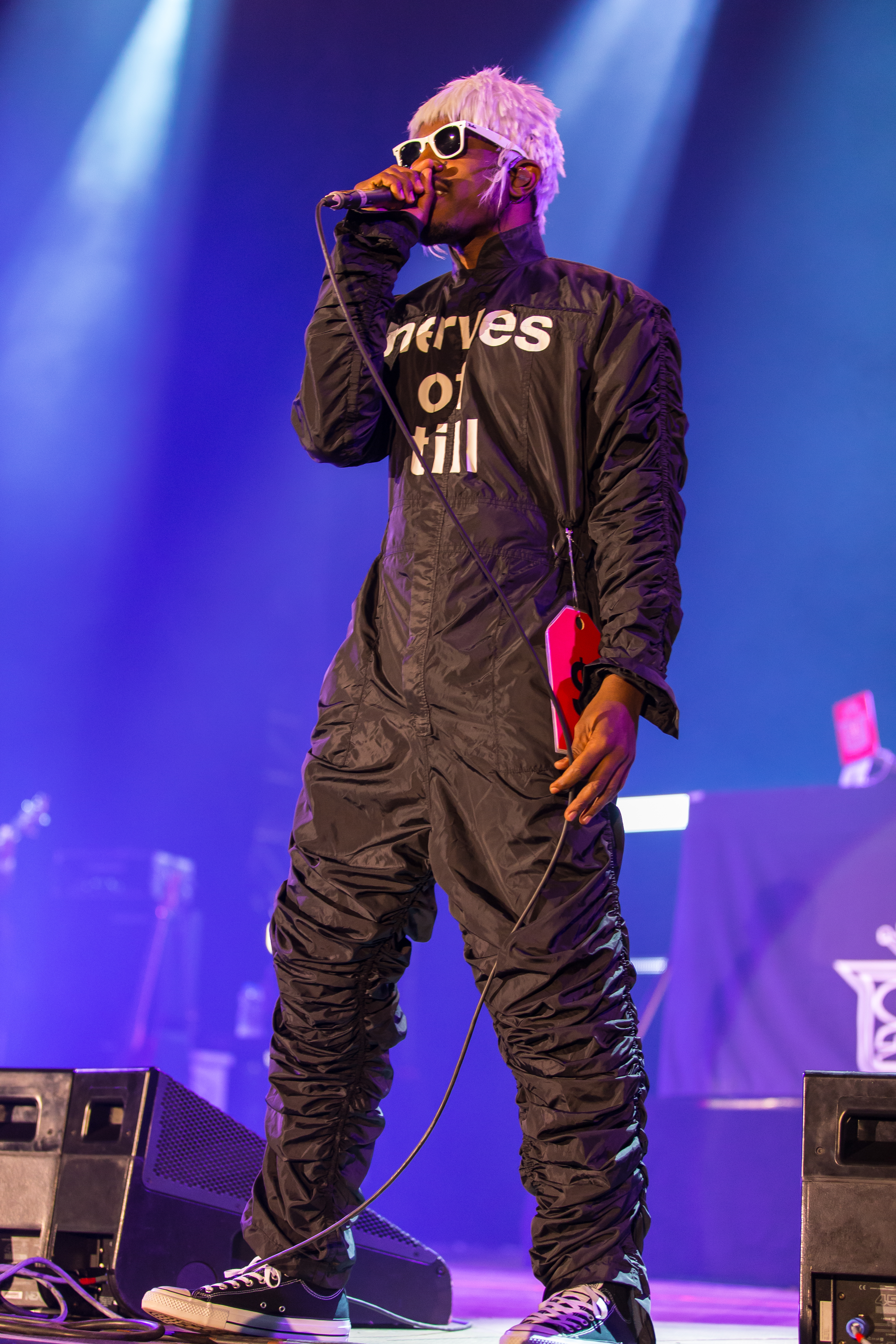
André 3000

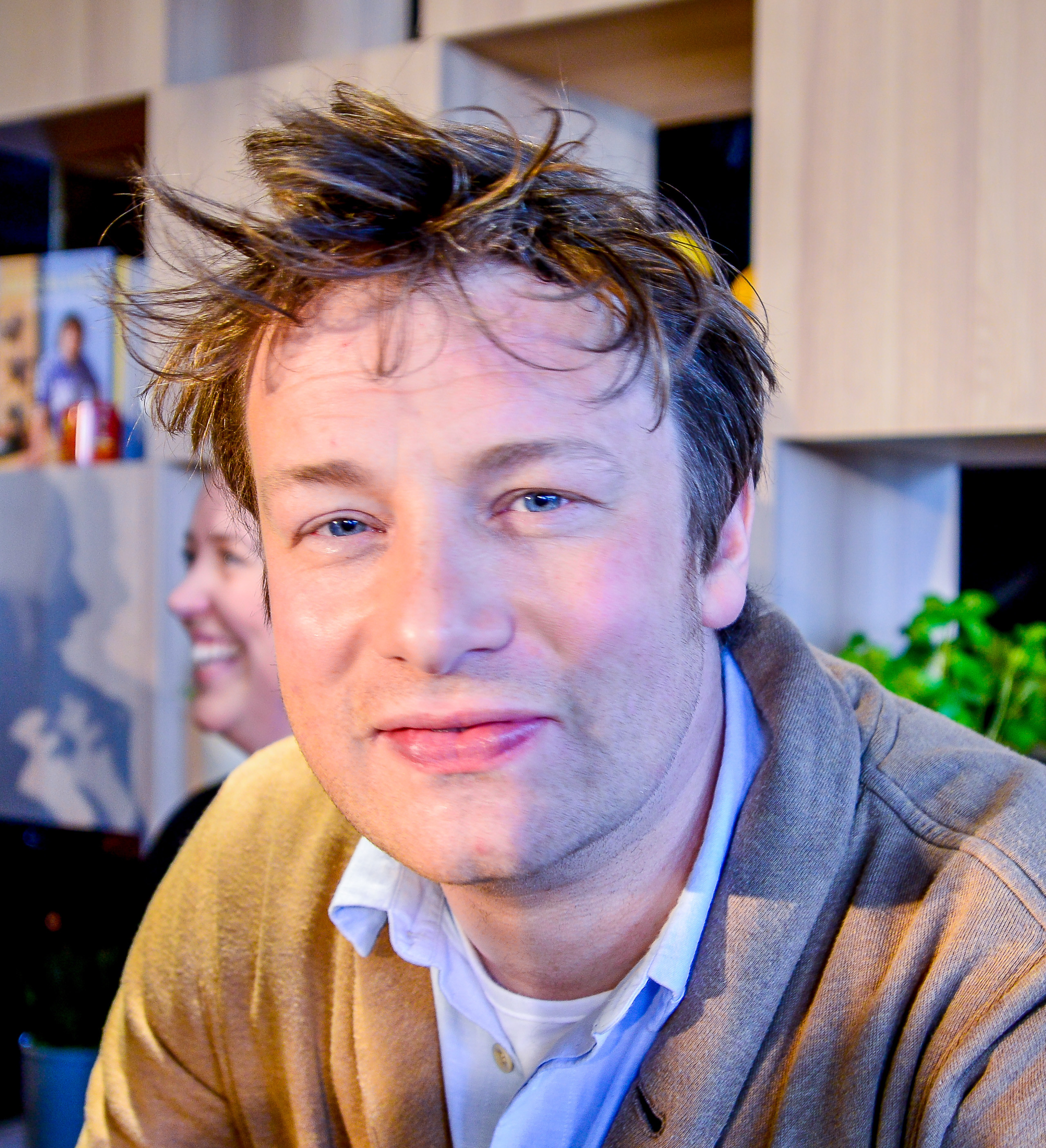
Jamie Oliver

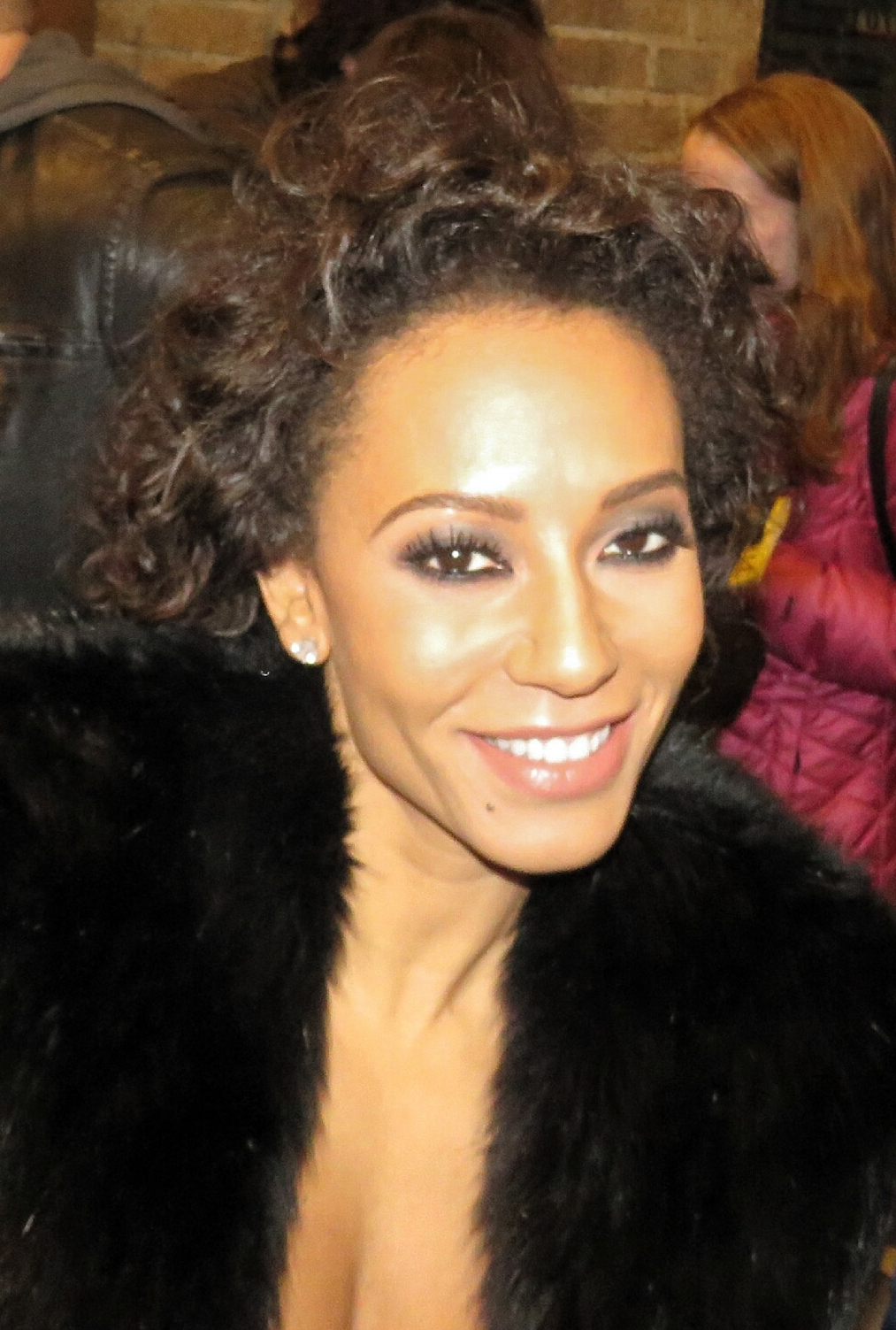
Mel B

- May 1 – Marc-Vivien Foé, Cameroonian footballer (d. 2003)
- May 2
  - David Beckham, English footballer
  - Ahmed Hassan, Egyptian footballer
- May 3 – Christina Hendricks, American actress
- May 7 – Roxana Maracineanu, Romanian born-French politician and swimmer
- May 8
  - Enrique Iglesias, Spanish singer
  - Jussi Markkanen, Finnish hockey player
- May 9 – Chris Diamantopoulos, Canadian actor
- May 10 – Hélio Castroneves, Brazilian racing driver
- May 12 – Jonah Lomu, New Zealand rugby player (d. 2015)
- May 13 – Itatí Cantoral, Mexican actress
- May 15
  - Ray Lewis, American football player
  - Janne Seurujärvi, Finnish Sami politician, and the first Sami to be elected to the Finnish Parliament.
- May 18
  - John Higgins, Scottish snooker player
  - Jack Johnson, American singer-songwriter
  - Irina Karavayeva, Russian trampolinist
- May 19
  - Jonas Renkse, Swedish musician
  - Masanobu Ando, Japanese actor
  - Zhang Ning, Chinese badminton player
- May 20 – Tahmoh Penikett, Canadian actor
- May 21 – Anthony Mundine, Australian rugby league player and boxer
- May 22 – Janne Niinimaa, Finnish hockey player
- May 25
  - Keiko Fujimori, Peruvian politician
  - Lauryn Hill, American singer
- May 27
  - André 3000, American musician, record producer, and actor
  - Jamie Oliver, English chef, restaurateur and television personality
- May 28 – Charmaine Sheh, Hong Kong actress
- May 29
  - David Burtka, American actor and professional chef
  - Mel B, English singer, songwriter, rapper, television personality, actress and author
  - Daniel Tosh, American comedian
- May 31 – Toni Nieminen, Finnish ski jumper

=== June ===
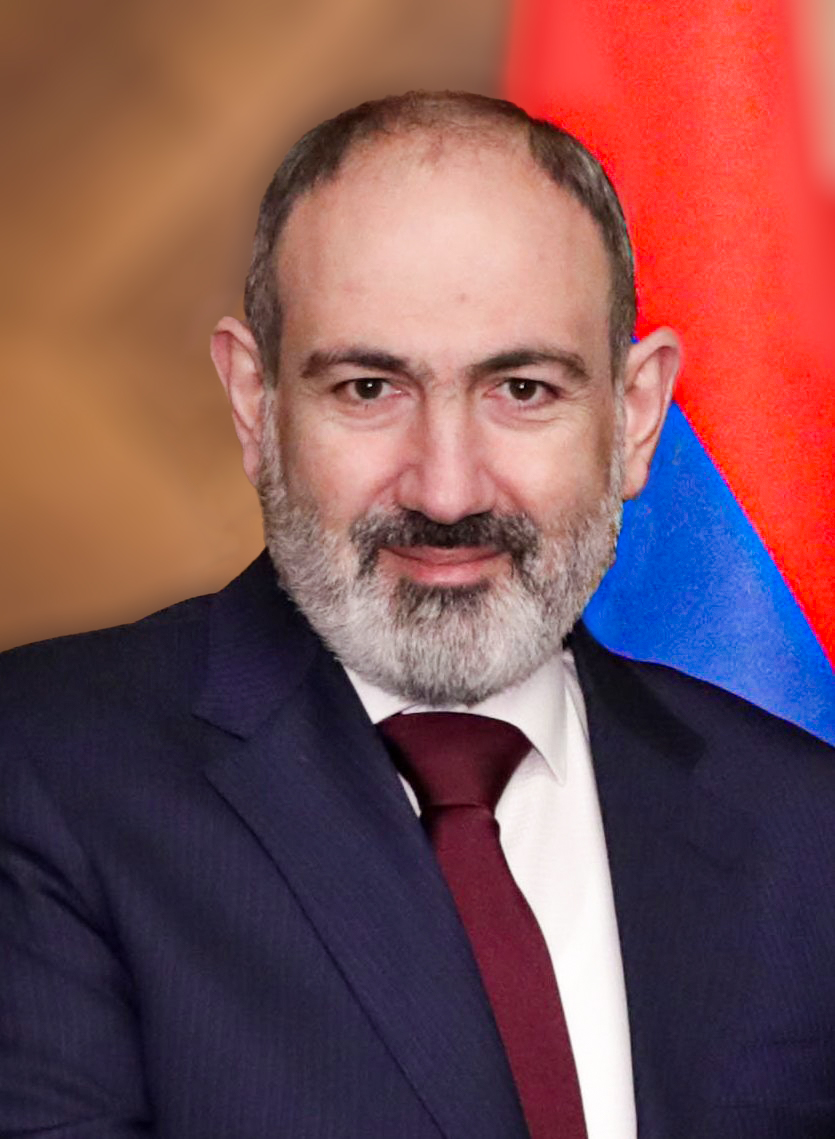
Nikol Pashinyan

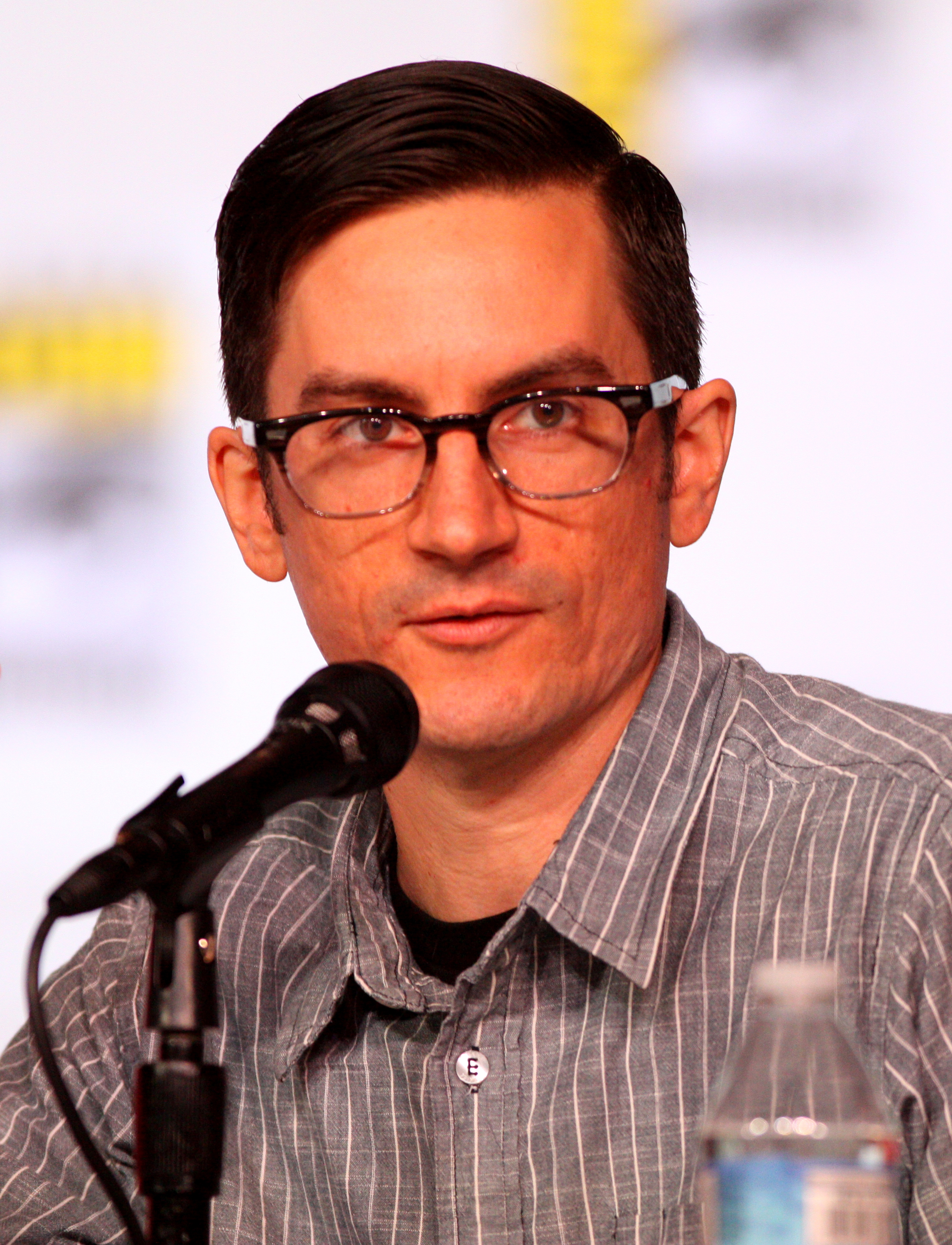
Bryan Konietzko

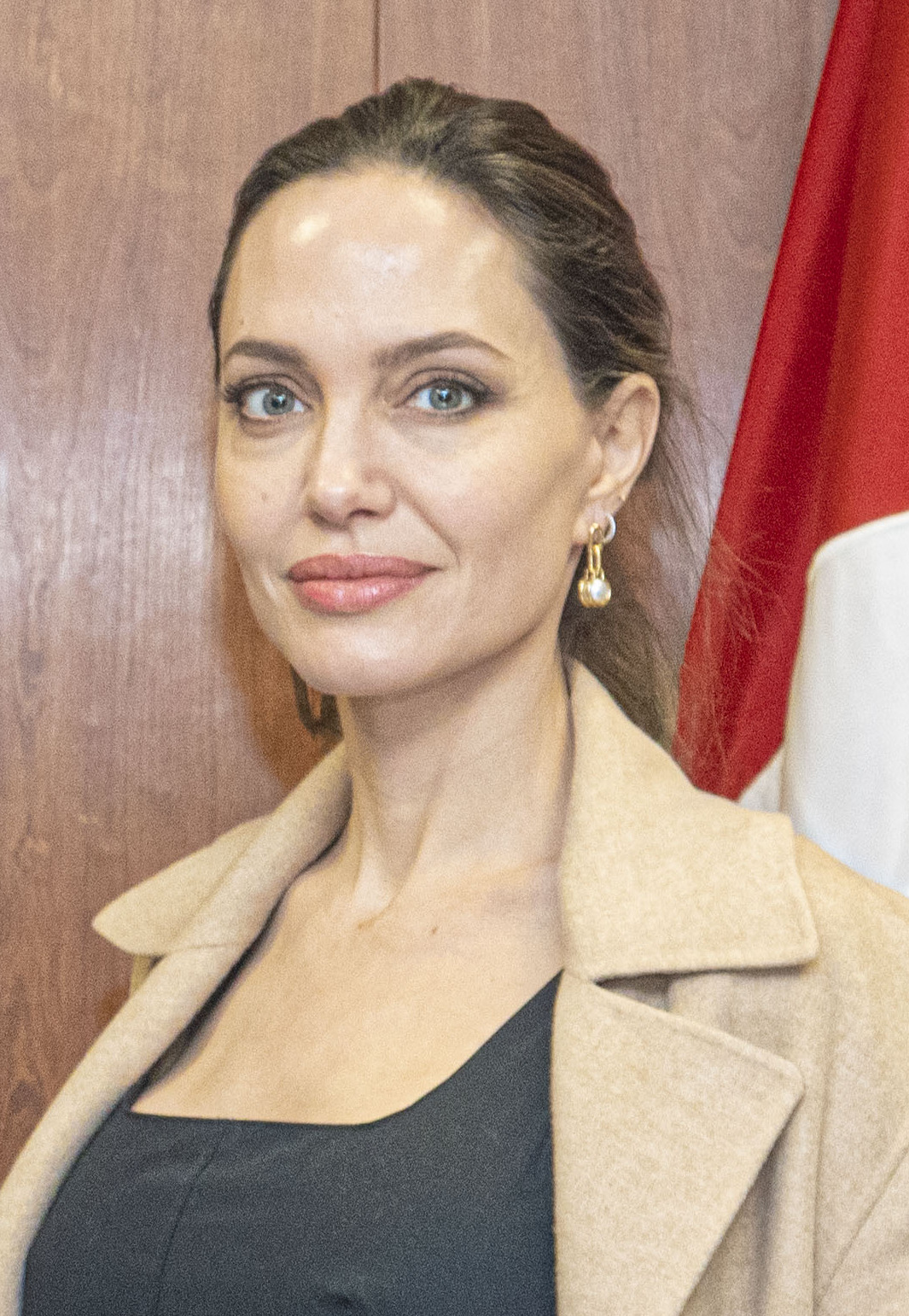
Angelina Jolie

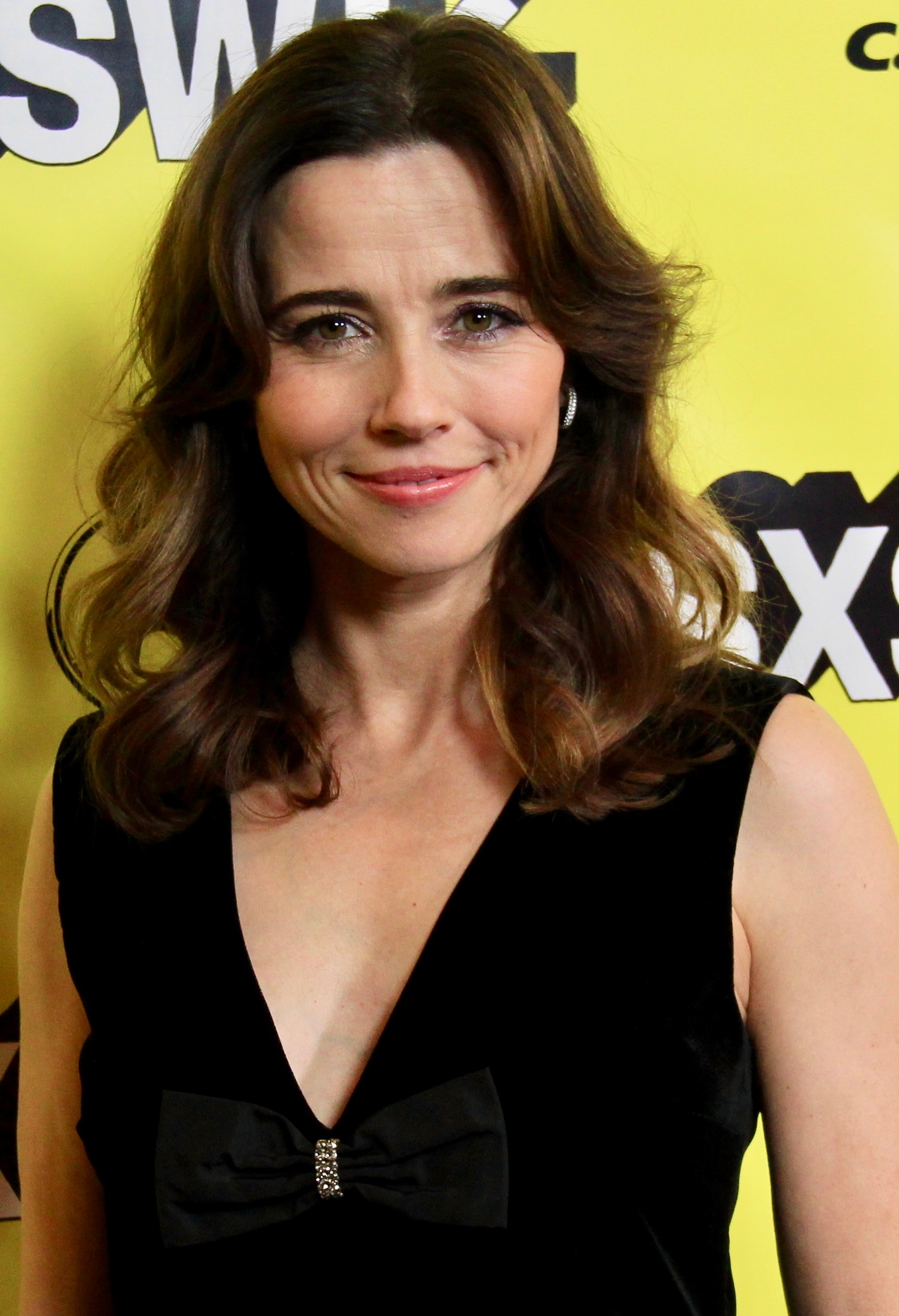
Linda Cardellini

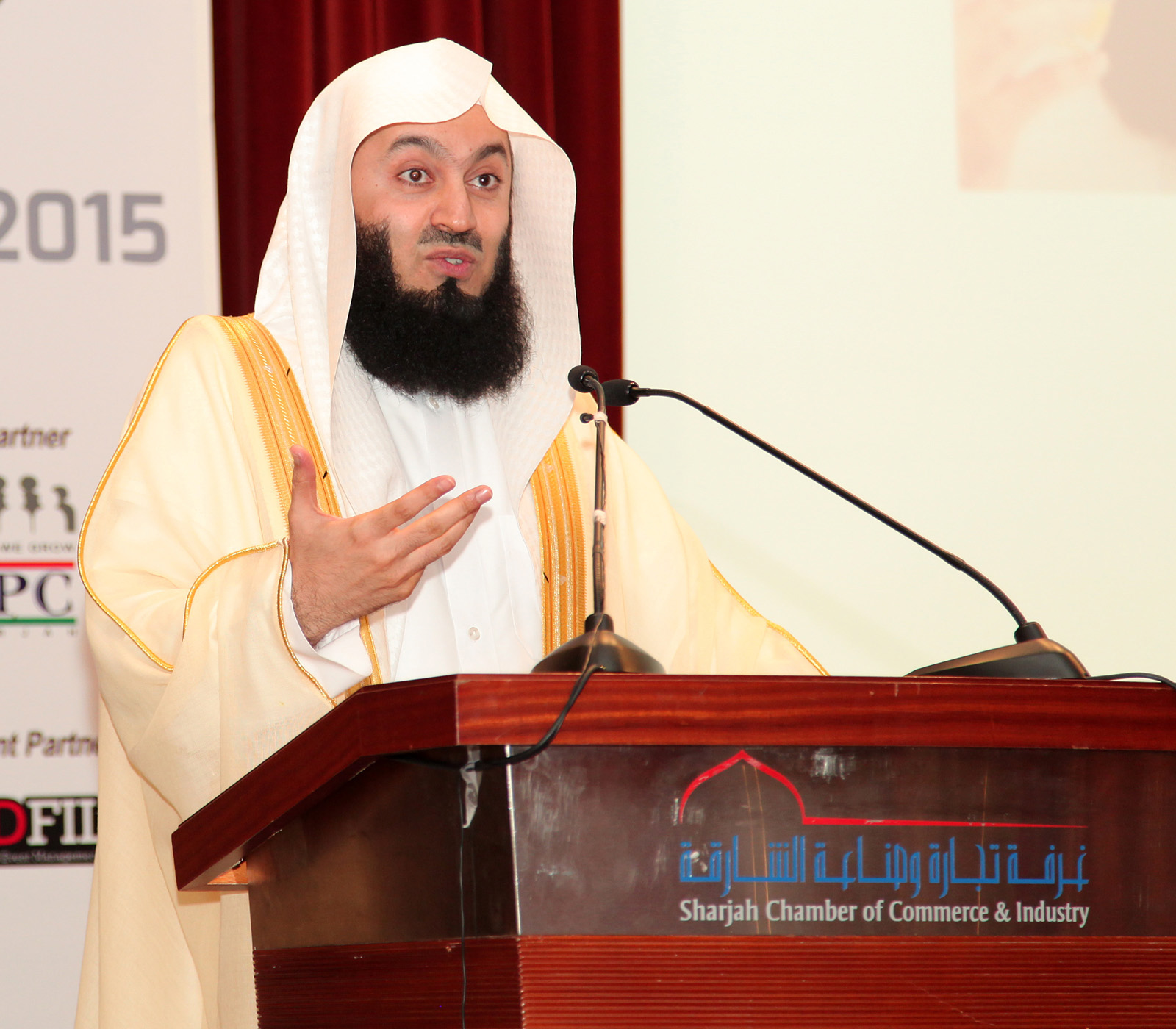
Ismail ibn Musa Menk

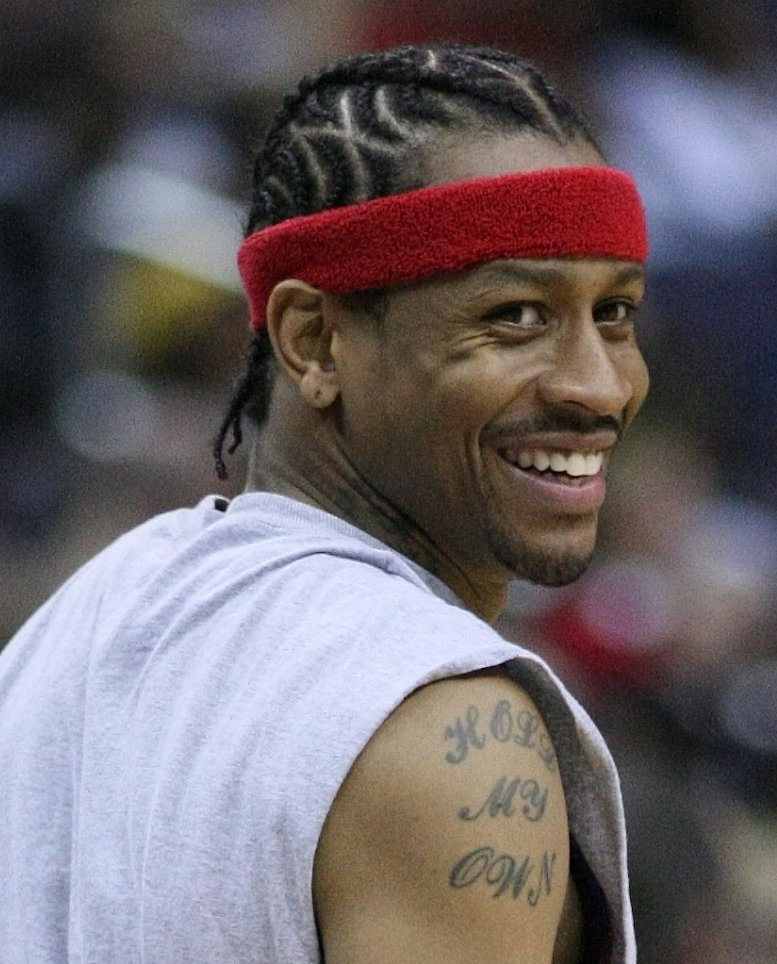
Allen Iverson

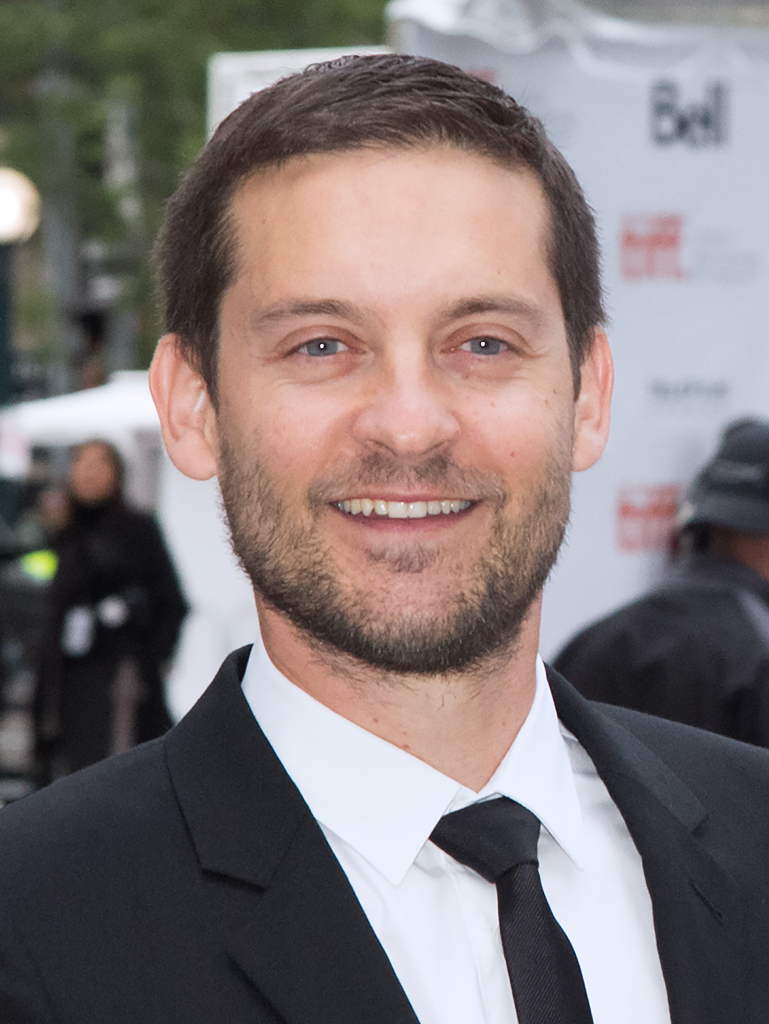
Tobey Maguire

- June 1
  - Nikol Pashinyan, Armenian politician, Prime Minister of Armenia
  - Frauke Petry, German politician
- June 4
  - Russell Brand, English actor and comedian
  - Angelina Jolie, American actress
- June 7
  - Allen Iverson, American basketball player
  - Ekta Kapoor, Indian actress
- June 8 – Shilpa Shetty, Bollywood actress
- June 9
  - Andrew Symonds, British-born Australian cricketer (d. 2022)
  - Ameesha Patel, Indian actress and model
  - Lord Villanueva, Filipino associate justice of the Sandiganbayan
- June 11 – Choi Ji-woo, South Korean actress and model
- June 15 – Elizabeth Reaser, American actress
- June 16 – Anabel Conde, Spanish singer
- June 18 – Martin St. Louis, Canadian hockey player
- June 19
  - Oksana Chusovitina, German artistic gymnast
  - Anthony Parker, American basketball player
  - Ed Coode, British rower
- June 23 – KT Tunstall, Scottish singer-songwriter
- June 24 – Christie Pearce, American footballer
- June 25
  - Linda Cardellini, American actress
  - Natasha Klauss, Colombian actress
  - Vladimir Kramnik, Russian chess player
- June 26 – Florence Loiret Caille, French actress
- June 27
  - Mufti Menk, Zimbabwean Muslim cleric and Mufti
  - Tobey Maguire, American actor
  - Mosese Rauluni, Fijian rugby union footballer
- June 28 – Jon Nödtveidt, Swedish singer (d. 2006)
- June 30
  - James Bannatyne, New Zealand footballer
  - Ralf Schumacher, German racing driver

=== July ===
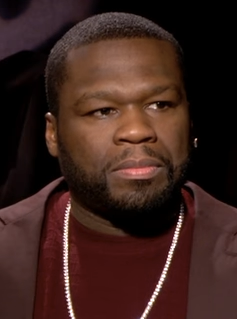
50 Cent

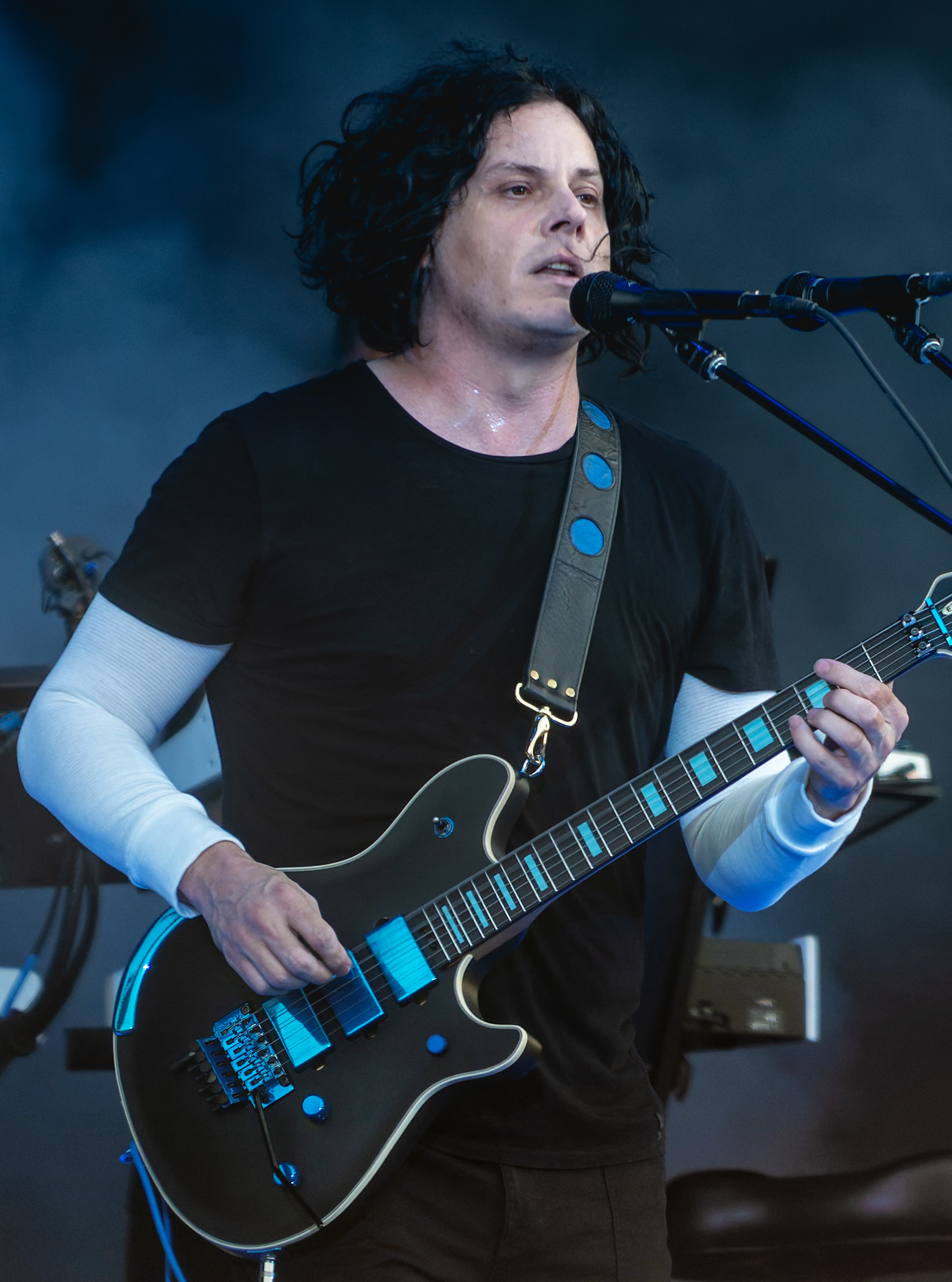
Jack White

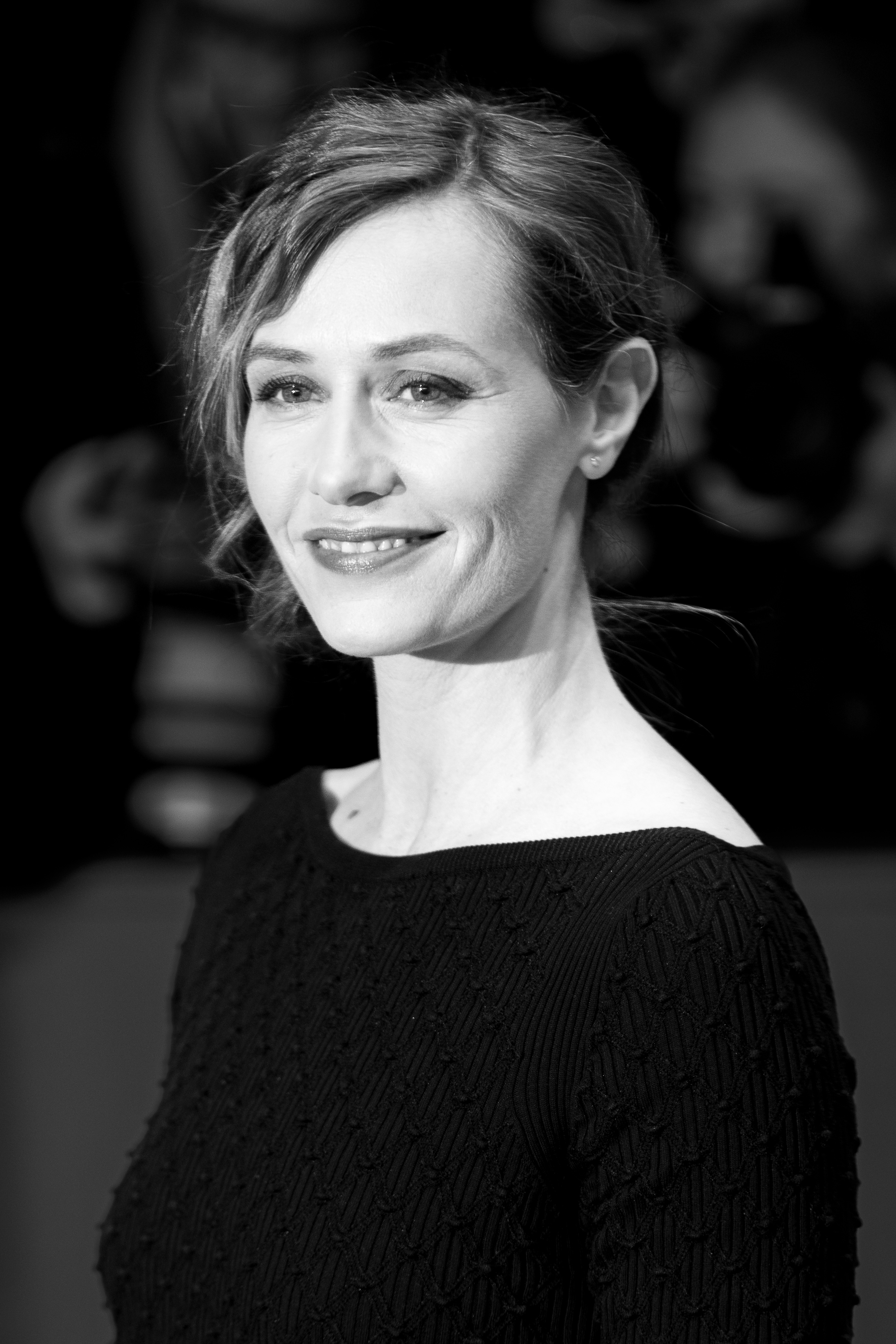
Cécile de France

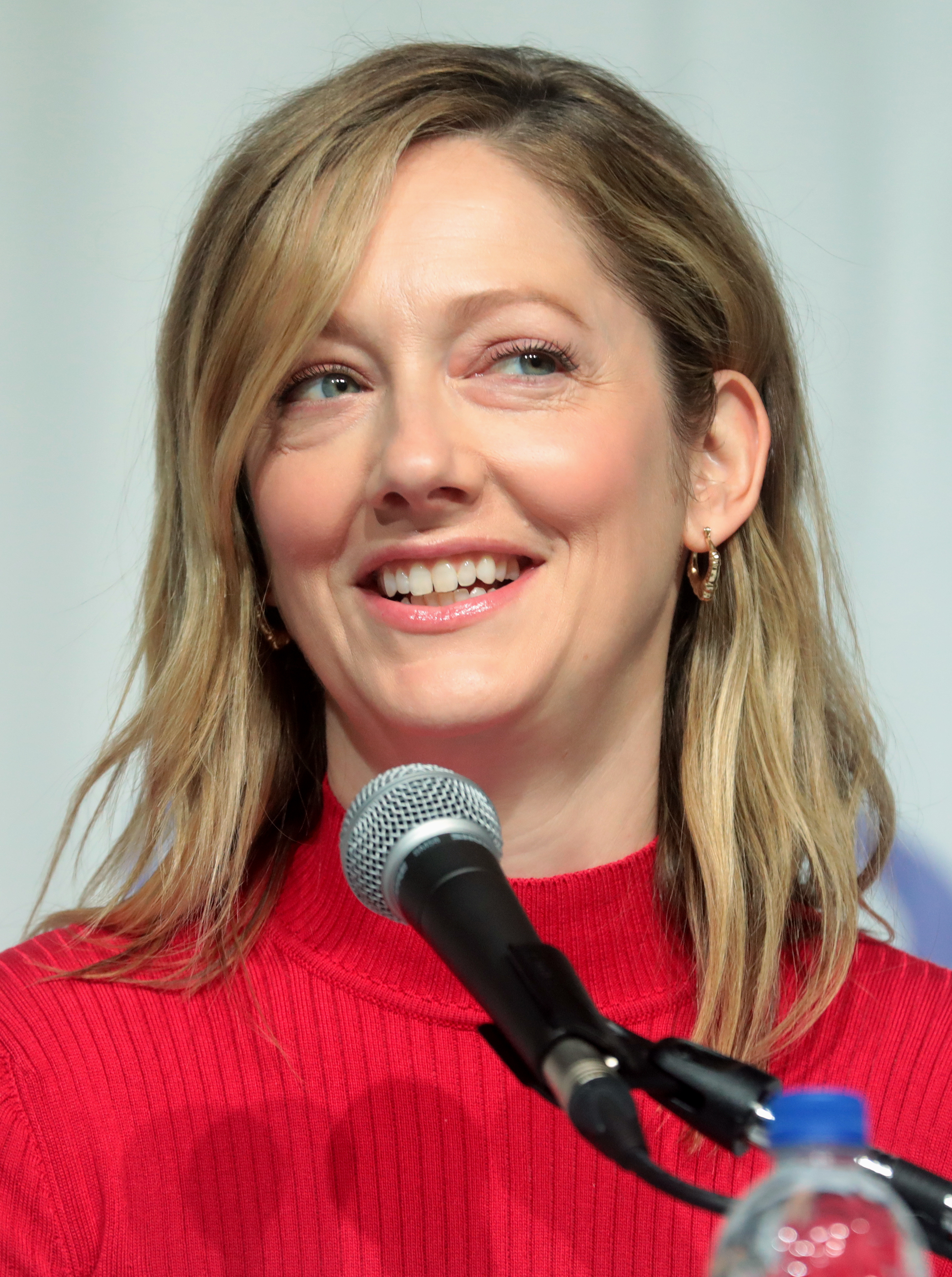
Judy Greer

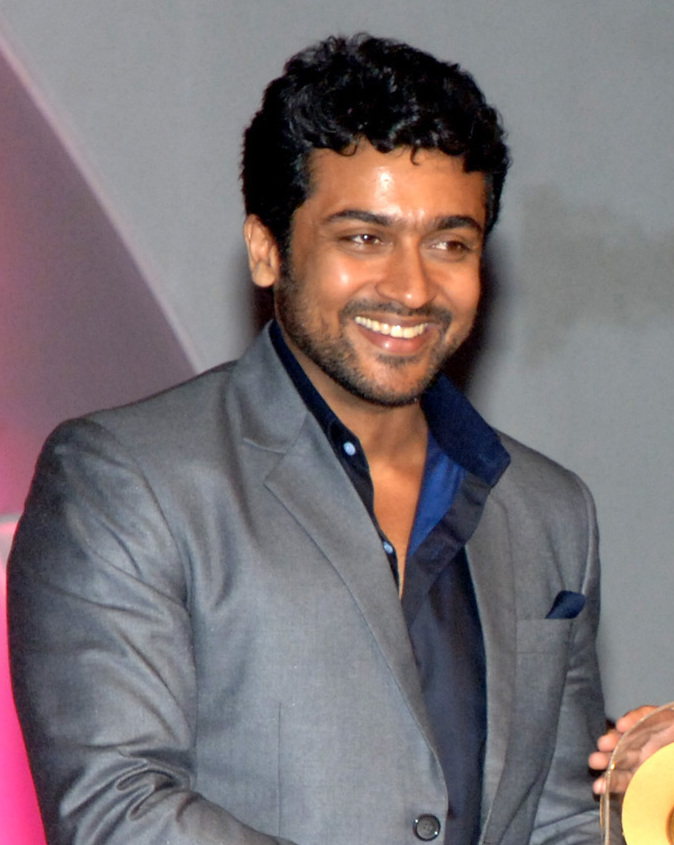
Suriya

- July 1 – Sufjan Stevens, American musician
- July 2 – Stefan Terblanche, South African rugby union player
- July 3 – Ryan McPartlin, American actor
- July 5
  - Zander de Bruyn, South African cricketer
  - Hernán Crespo, Argentinian footballer
  - Ai Sugiyama, Japanese tennis player
- July 6
  - Sebastián Rulli, Argentine actor and model
  - Alessandro Juliani, Canadian actor and singer
  - 50 Cent, rapper, actor, and businessman
- July 7 – Nina Hoss, German actress
- July 8
  - Amara, Indonesian actress, model, and singer
  - Régis Laconi, French motorcycle racer
  - Květa Peschke, Czech tennis player
  - Elias Viljanen, Finnish musician
- July 9
  - Shelton Benjamin, American professional wrestler
  - Gaizka Garitano, Spanish football player and coach
  - Damián Szifron, Argentine director and screenwriter
  - Jack White, American singer and guitarist
- July 10
  - Martina Colombari, Italian actress, model and television presenter
  - Edoardo Gabbriellini, Italian actor, screenwriter, and director
  - Stefán Karl Stefánsson, Icelandic actor (d. 2018)
- July 16
  - Ana Paula Arósio, Brazilian actress and model
  - Edoardo Gabbriellini, Italian actor, screenwriter, and director
- July 17
  - Elena Anaya, Spanish actress
  - Darude, Finnish DJ and record producer
  - Cécile de France, Belgian actress
  - Loretta Harrop, Australian triathlete
  - Terence Tao, Australian-American mathematician
- July 18 – Daron Malakian, Armenian-American guitarist
- July 19 – Hélène Tigroudja, French jurist and international law expert.
- July 20
  - Judy Greer, American actress and author
  - Ray Allen, American basketball player
- July 21 – David Dastmalchian, American actor
- July 23 – Suriya, Indian actor
- July 25 – Evgeni Nabokov, Kazakh-Russian hockey goaltender
- July 26 – Liz Truss, English politician, former Prime Minister of the United Kingdom
- July 27 – Alex Rodriguez, American baseball player and businessman
- July 28 – Leonor Watling, Spanish actress and singer

=== August ===
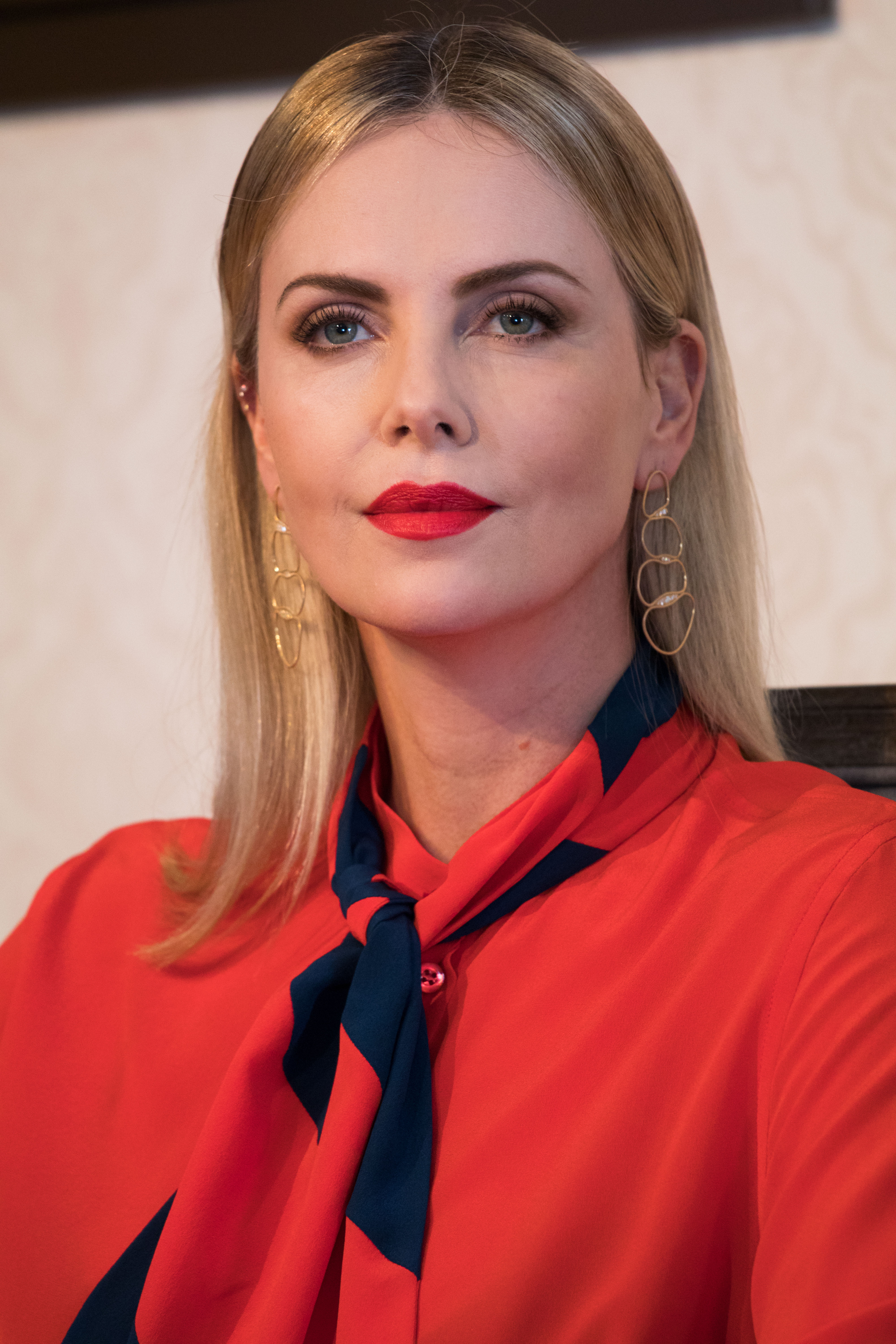
Charlize Theron

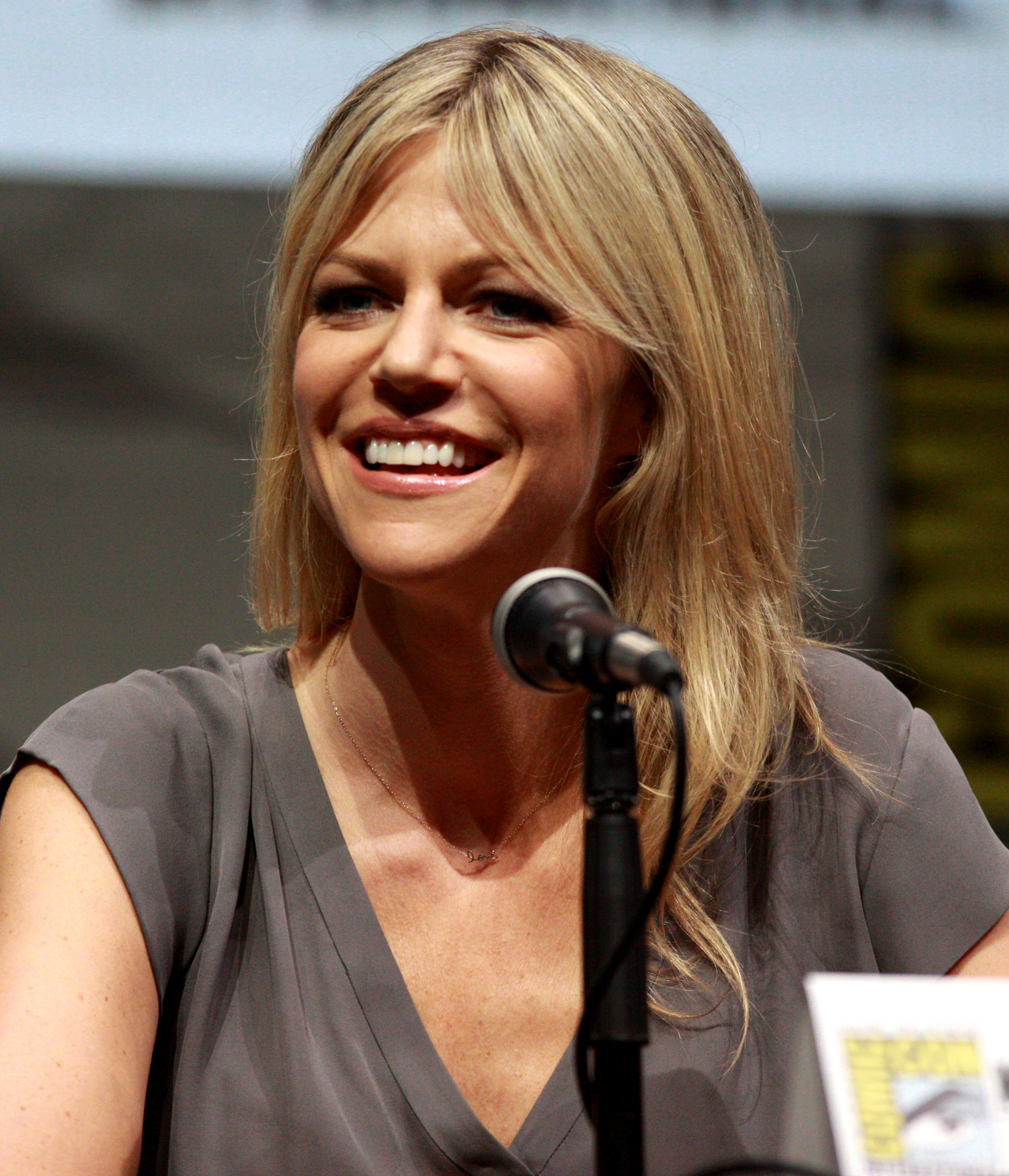
Kaitlin Olson

- August 1 – Danny Chan Kwok-kwan, Hong Kong actor
- August 3
  - Wael Gomaa, Egyptian footballer
  - Evika Siliņa, Latvian politician, prime minister
- August 4
  - Jason Crump, Australian motorcycle speedway rider
  - Eicca Toppinen, Finnish cellist
- August 6 – Renate Götschl, Austrian alpine skier
- August 7
  - Gaahl (Kristian Eivind Espedal), Norwegian musician
  - Megan Gale, Australian model and actress
  - Charlize Theron, South African-born American actress
- August 9 – Mahesh Babu, Indian actor
- August 12 – Casey Affleck, American actor and film director
- August 13 – Shoaib Akhtar, Pakistani fast bowler
- August 15 – Kara Wolters, American basketball player
- August 16 – Taika Waititi, New Zealand filmmaker, actor, and comedian
- August 17 – Ian Casocot, Filipino writer
- August 18 – Kaitlin Olson, American actress
- August 22 – Rodrigo Santoro, Brazilian actor
- August 25 – Petria Thomas, Australian swimmer
- August 29 – Dante Basco, American film, television and voice actor
- August 30 – Radhi Jaidi, Tunisian footballer
- August 31 – Sara Ramirez, Mexican-American actress

=== September ===
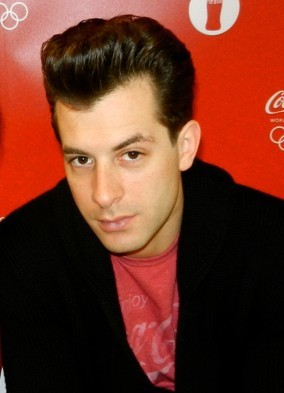
Mark Ronson

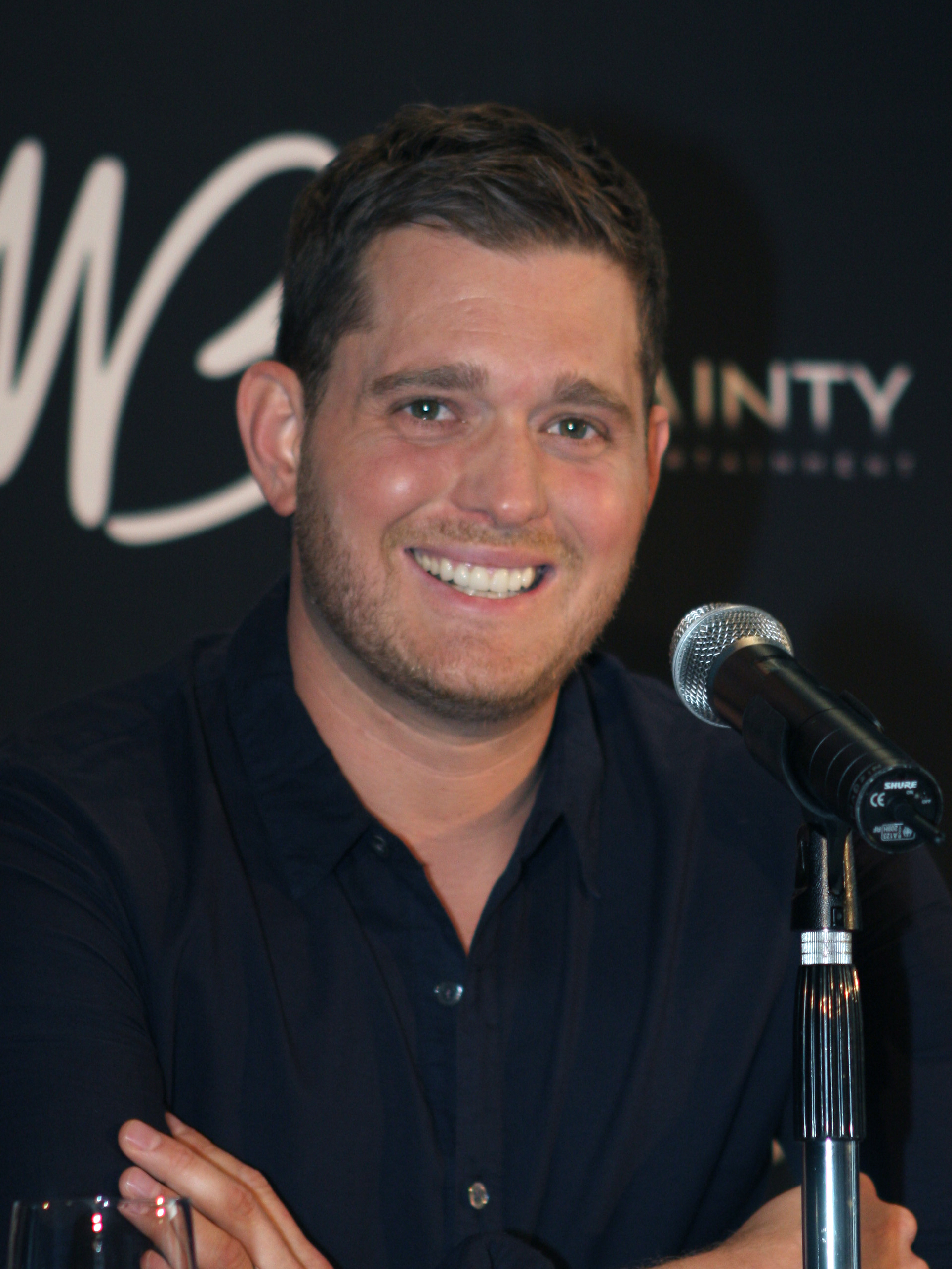
Michael Bublé

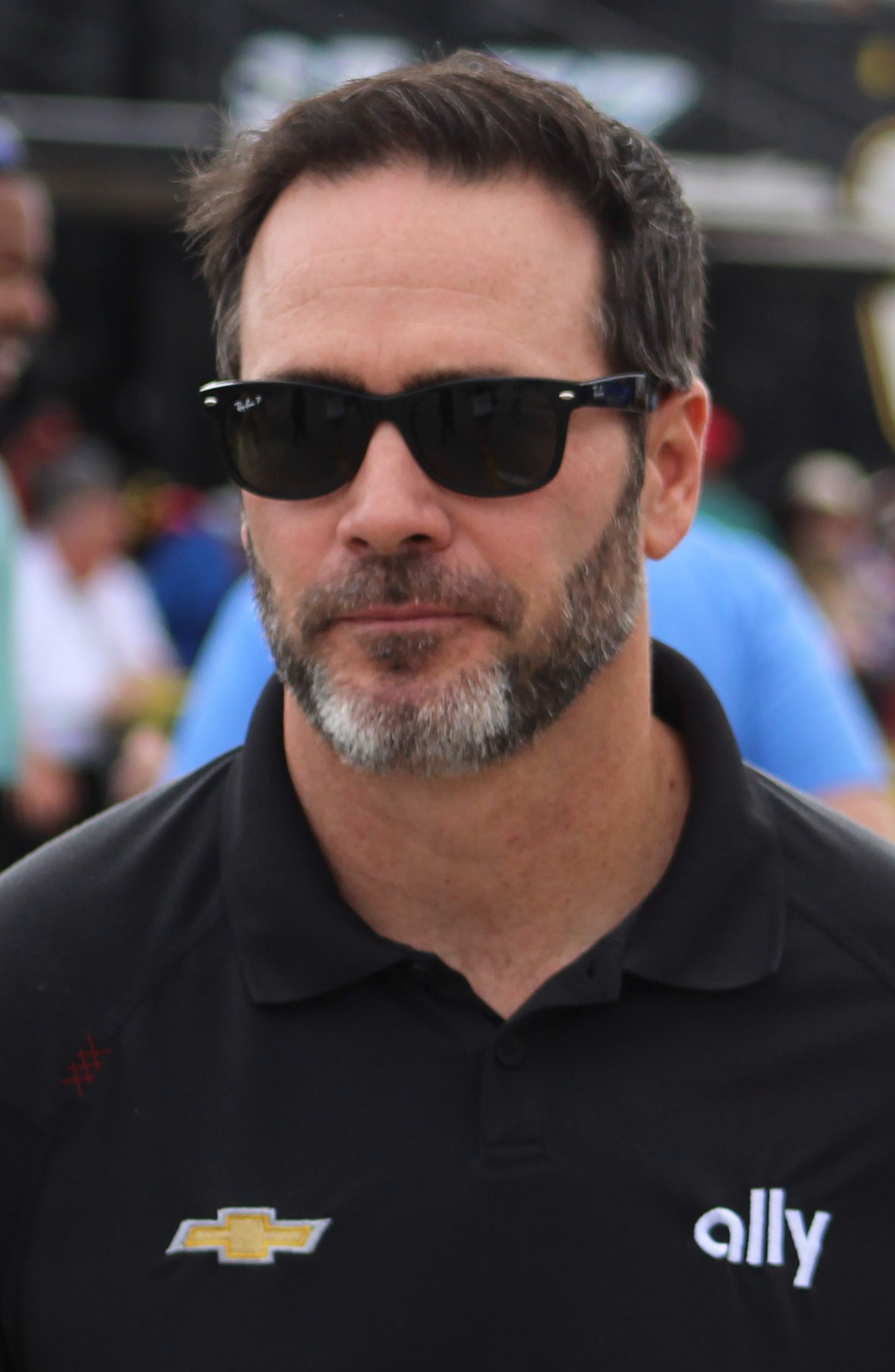
Jimmie Johnson

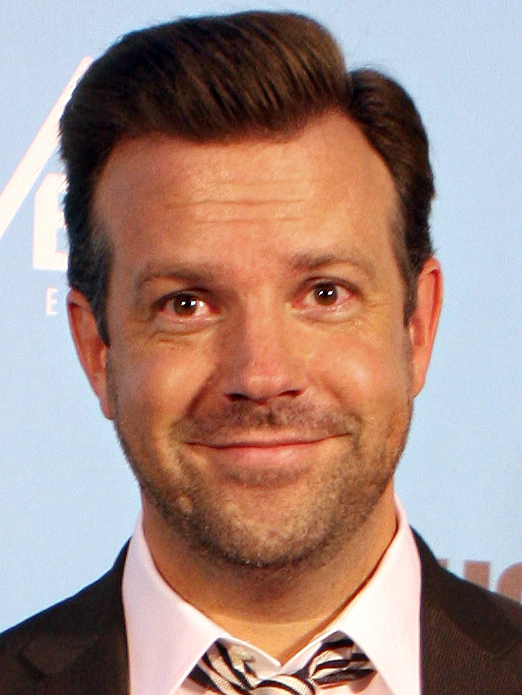
Jason Sudeikis

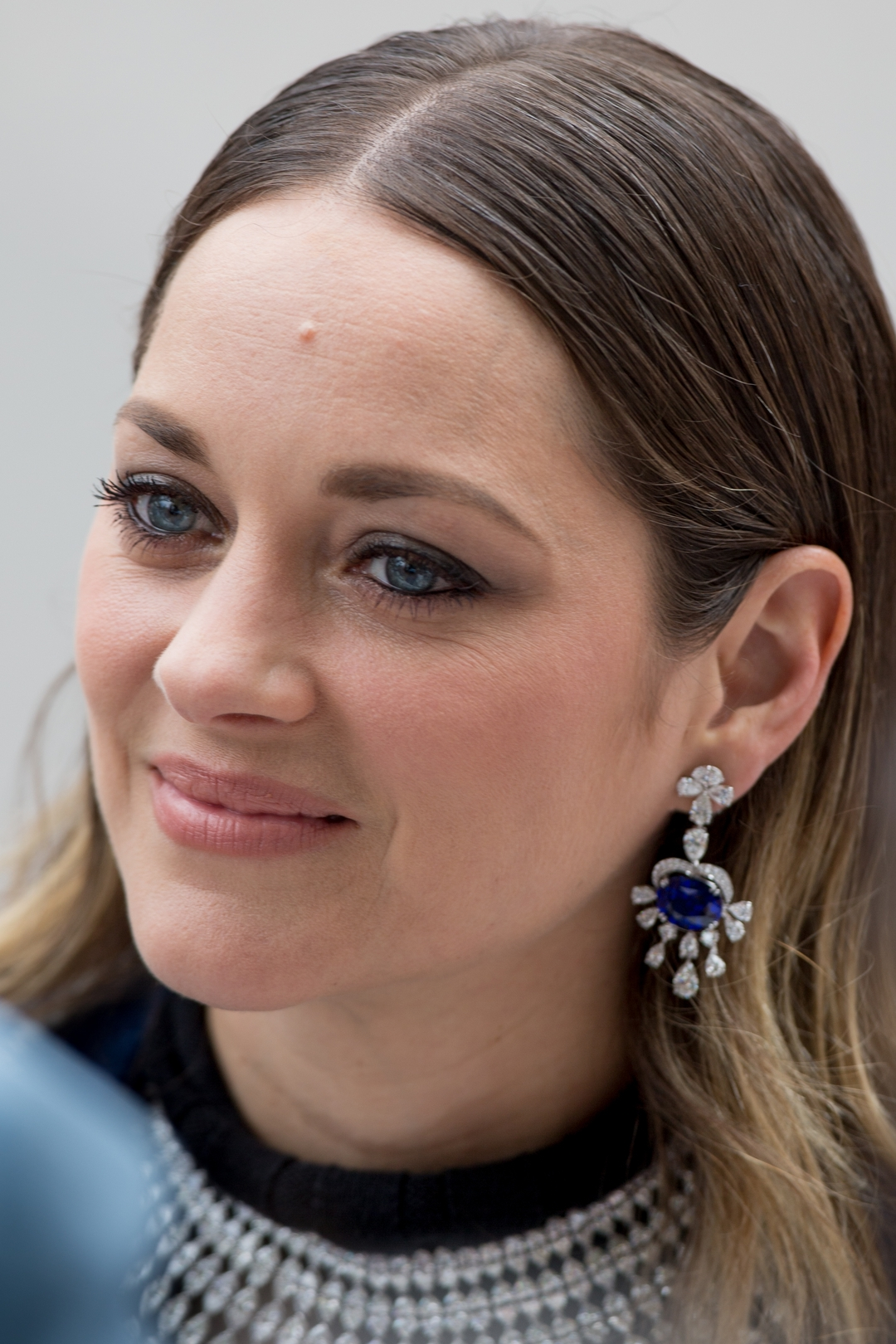
Marion Cotillard

- September 1
  - Sarah Mintz, Colombian actress and model
  - Natalie Bassingthwaighte, Australian actress and singer
  - Scott Speedman, Canadian actor
- September 3 – Redfoo, American disc jockey
- September 4 – Mark Ronson, English DJ, record producer, and singer
- September 6 – Ryoko Tani, Japanese judoka
- September 7 – Norifumi Abe, Japanese motorcycle road racer (died 2007)
- September 8 – Elena Likhovtseva, Russian tennis player
- September 9 – Michael Bublé, Canadian musician
- September 13
  - Peter Ho, American-Taiwanese singer and actor
  - Idan Tal, Israeli footballer
- September 16 – Gal Fridman, Israeli windsurfer
- September 17 – Jimmie Johnson, American race car driver
- September 18 – Jason Sudeikis, American actor, comedian, and screenwriter
- September 20
  - Asia Argento, Italian actress, singer, and director
  - Moon Bloodgood, American actress
  - Juan Pablo Montoya, Colombian racing driver
  - Joe Roff, Australian rugby union player
- September 22 – Ethan Moreau, Canadian hockey player
- September 23 – Kim Dong-moon, South Korean badminton player
- September 28 – Ana Brnabić, Prime Minister of Serbia
- September 30
  - Marion Cotillard, French actress, singer, songwriter, and musician
  - Ta-Nehisi Coates, American author and journalist

=== October ===
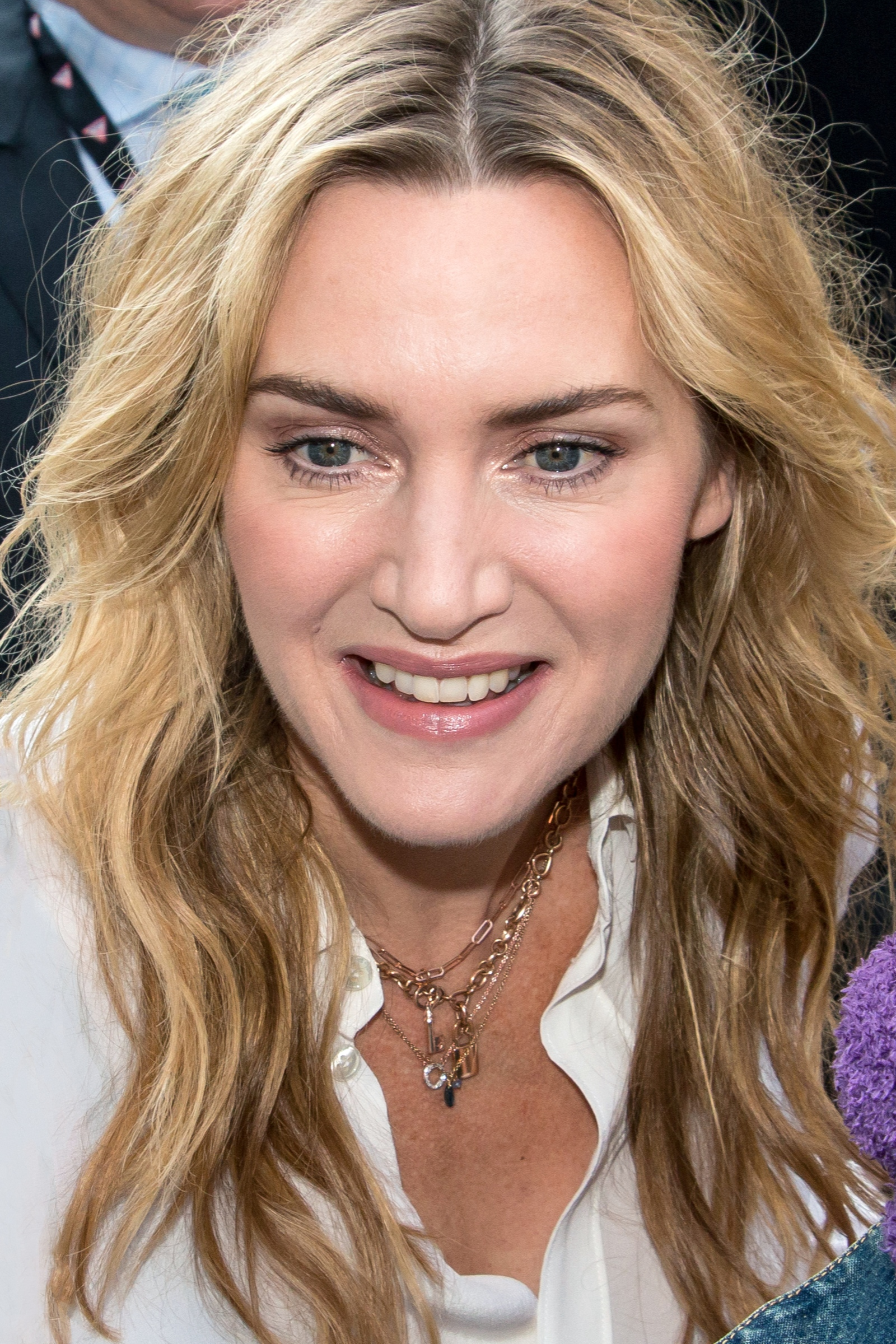
Kate Winslet

- October 1 – Bimba Bosé, Spanish model, actress and singer (d. 2017)
- October 3 – Alanna Ubach, American actress and singer
- October 5
  - Parminder Nagra, British actress
  - Kate Winslet, British actress
  - Gao Yuanyuan, Chinese actress
- October 6
  - Martin Jørgensen, Danish footballer and coach
  - Peter Pellegrini, Slovak politician, President of Slovakia
- October 8 – Marc Molinaro, American politician
- October 9 – Sean Lennon, British-American musician, songwriter, producer and multi-instrumentalist
- October 10 – Ihsahn, Norwegian musician
- October 12 – Marion Jones, American athlete
- October 14
  - Floyd Landis, American cyclist
  - Shaznay Lewis, English singer
  - Carlos Spencer, New Zealand rugby union player and coach
- October 15 – Michél Mazingu-Dinzey, German-Congolese footballer
- October 16 – Jacques Kallis, South African cricketer
- October 21 – Henrique Hilário, Portuguese footballer
- October 22
  - Jesse Tyler Ferguson, American actor
  - Míchel Salgado, Spanish footballer
- October 25
  - Zadie Smith, English writer
  - Antony Starr, New Zealand actor
- October 28 – Krisztián Zahorecz, Hungarian football player (d. 2019)

=== November ===
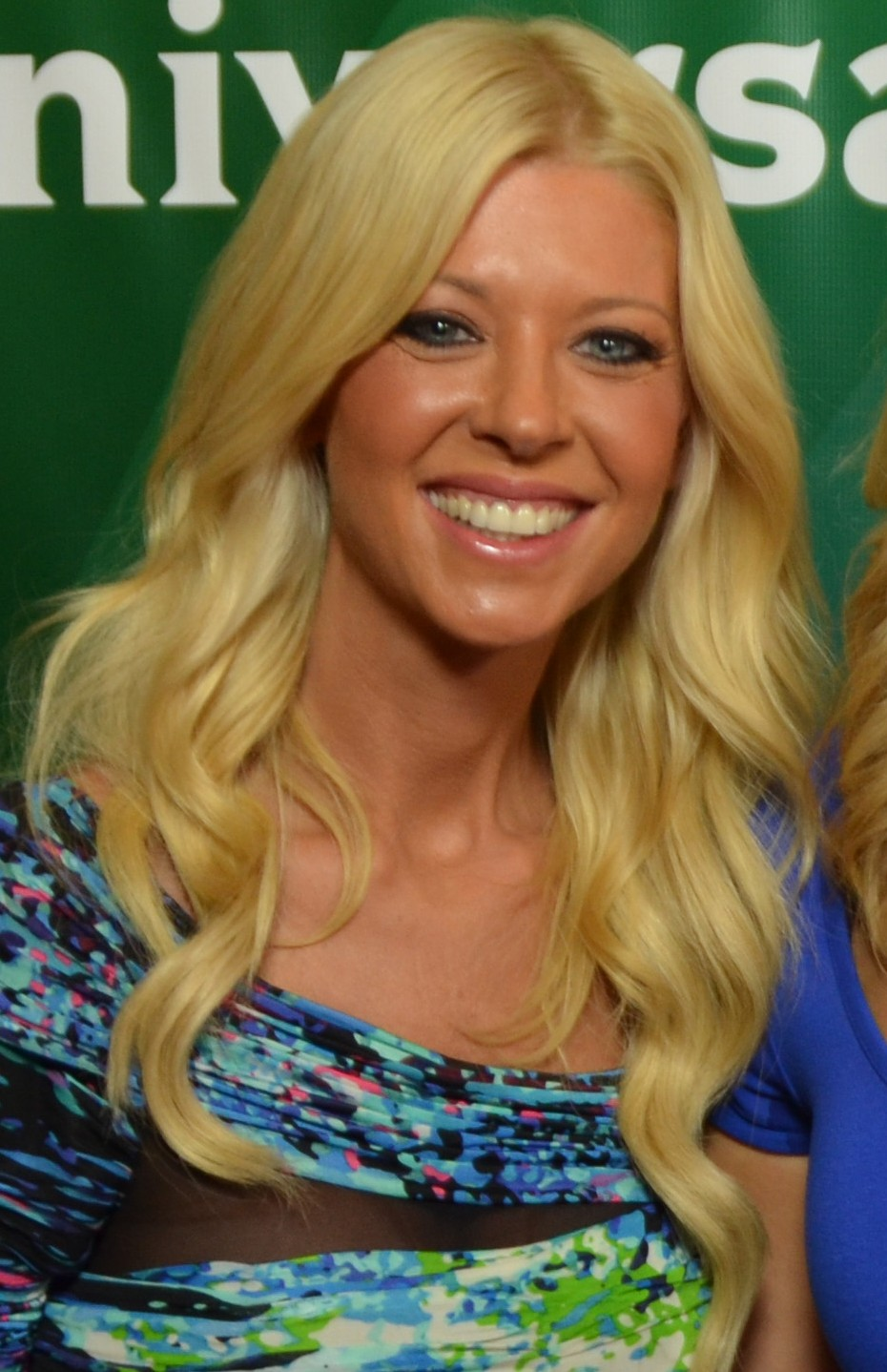
Tara Reid

- November 2 – Danny Cooksey, American actor and comedian
- November 3 – Marta Domínguez, Spanish athlete
- November 4
  - Éric Fichaud, Canadian hockey player
  - Lorenzen Wright, American basketball player (d. 2010)
- November 8
  - Ángel Corella, Spanish dancer
  - Tara Reid, American actress
- November 10 – Markko Märtin, Estonian racing driver
- November 11
  - Daisuke Ohata, Japanese rugby union player
  - Angélica Vale, Mexican-American actress, singer, and comedian
- November 12
  - Jason Lezak, American swimmer
  - Amy Neighbors, American politician
- November 13 – Ivica Dragutinović, Serbian footballer
- November 14
  - Luizão, Brazilian footballer
  - Gary Vaynerchuk, American-Belarusian entrepreneur and internet personality
- November 18
  - Anthony McPartlin, British TV presenter, actor and singer
  - David Ortiz, Dominican-American baseball player
- November 19 – Sushmita Sen, Indian actress and model, former Miss Universe.
- November 20
  - Dierks Bentley, American country music singer
  - Joshua Gomez, American actor
- November 21
  - Cherie Johnson, American actress
  - Chris Moneymaker, American poker player
  - Aaron Solowoniuk, Canadian drummer
- November 28 – Eka Kurniawan, Indonesian writer
- November 30 – Mindy McCready, American country music singer (d. 2013)

=== December ===
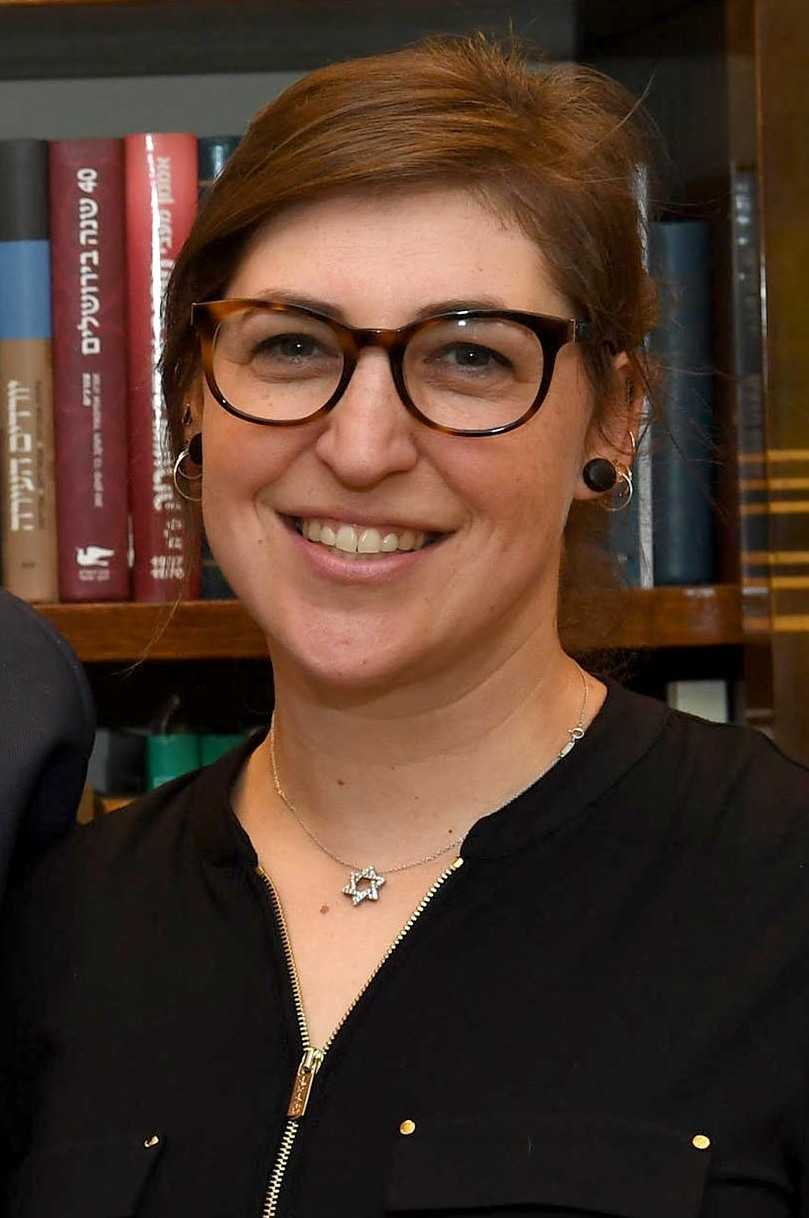
Mayim Bialik

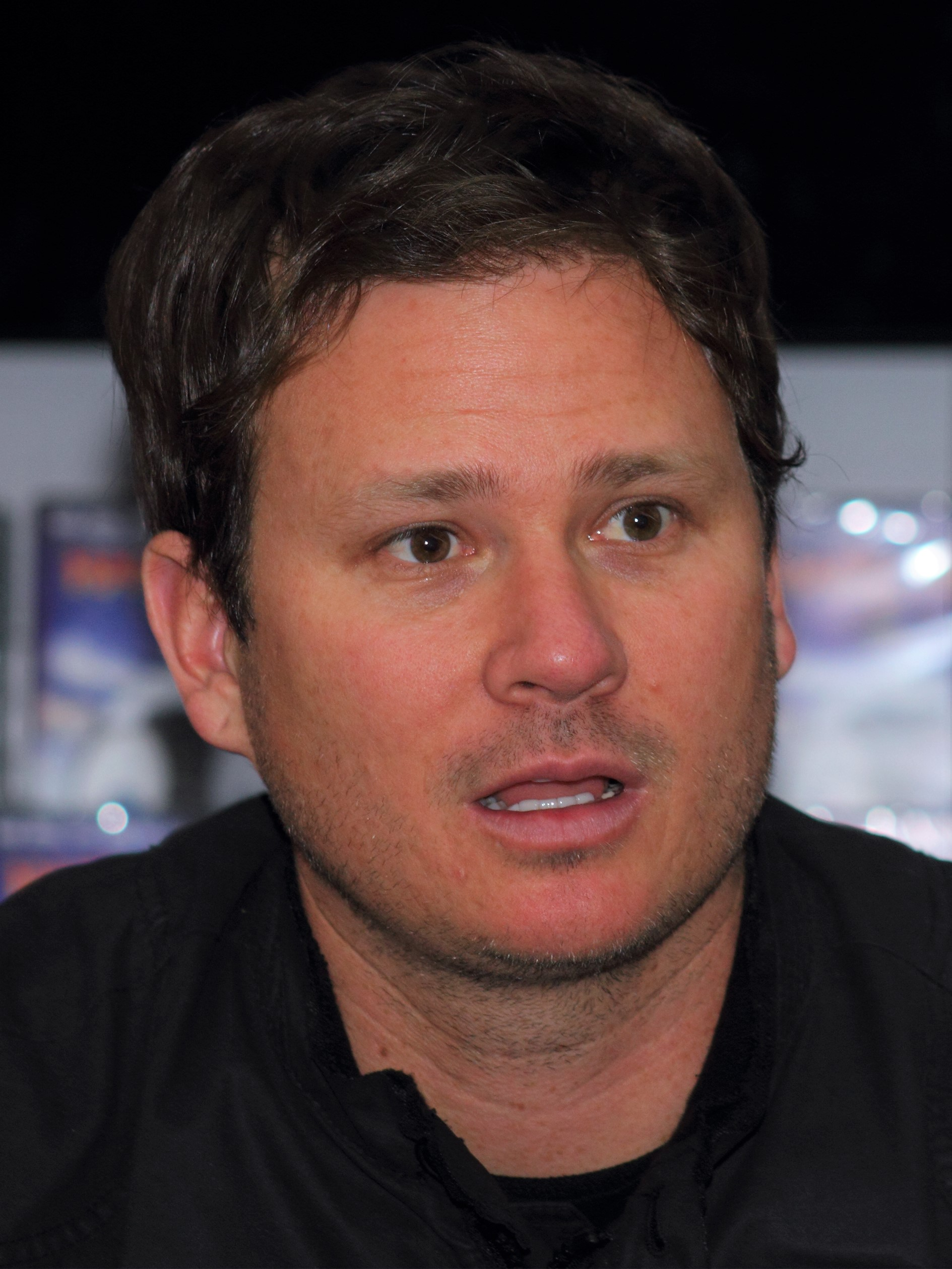
Tom DeLonge

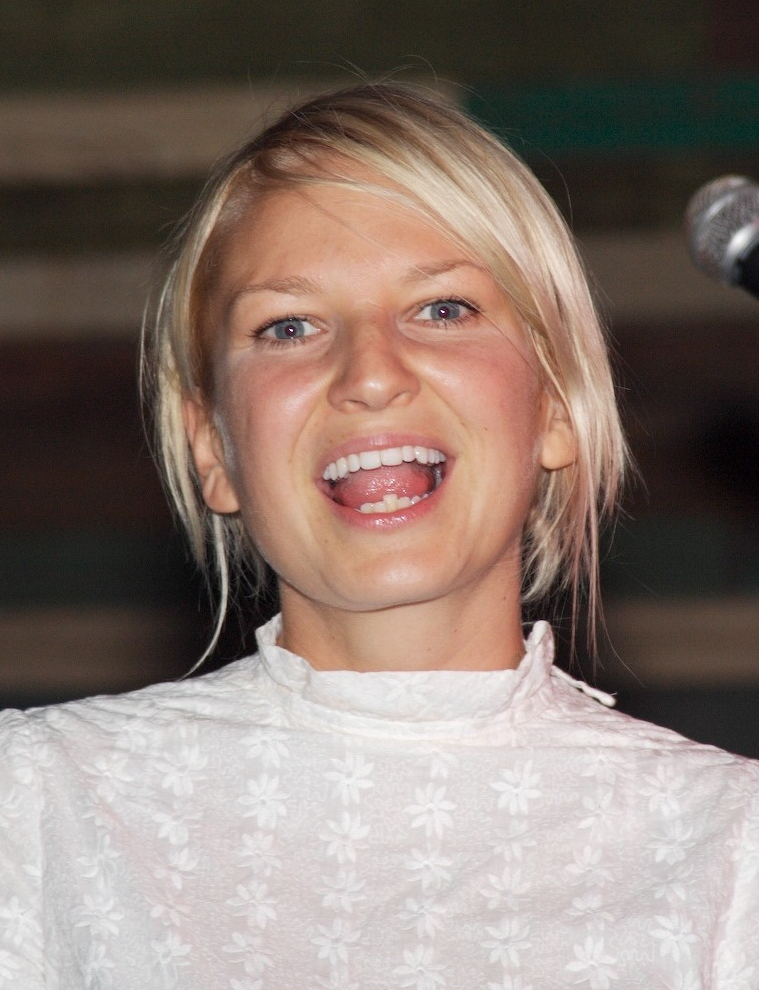
Sia

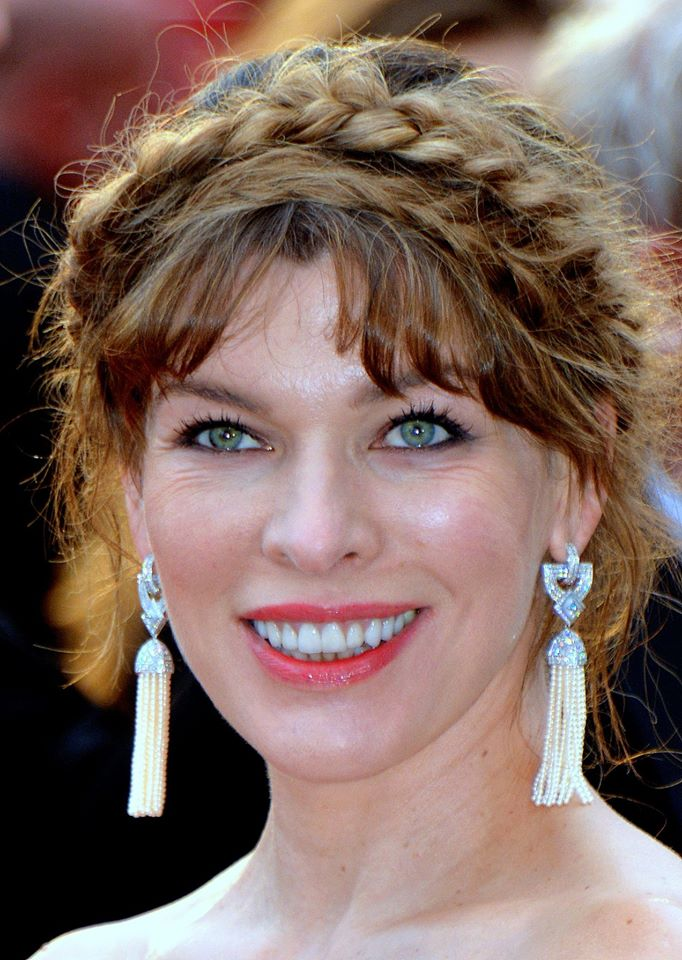
Milla Jovovich

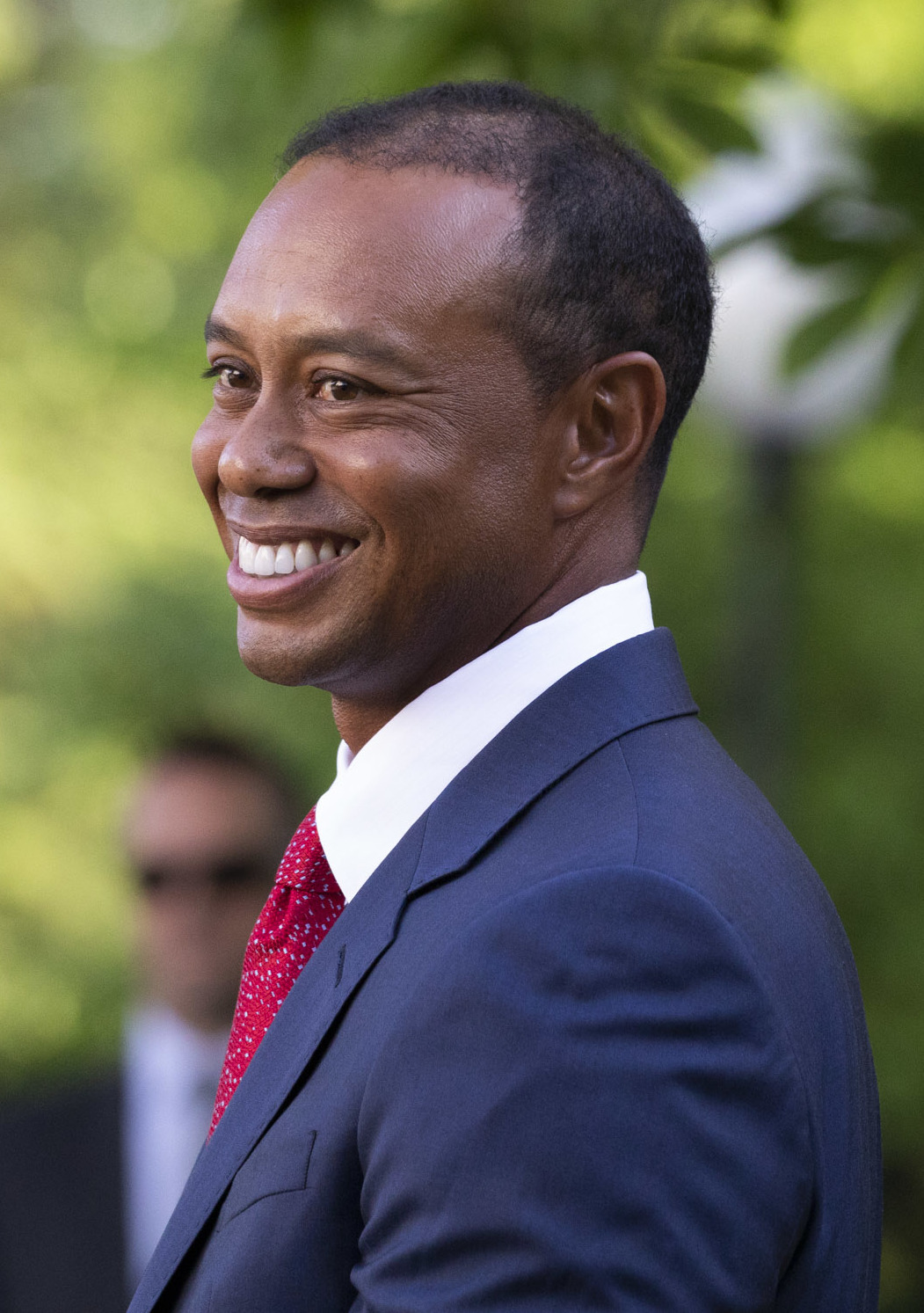
Tiger Woods

- December 5
  - Sofi Marinova, Bulgarian singer
  - Ronnie O'Sullivan, British snooker player
  - Paula Patton, American actress
- December 6 – Ashin, Taiwanese singer
  - Mia Love, American political commentator and politician who served in the United States House of Representatives from 2015 to 2019 in Utah, the first and to date only black woman elected to congress as a republican
- December 10 – Emmanuelle Chriqui, Canadian actress
- December 12
  - Mayim Bialik, Israeli-American actress and neuroscientist
  - Houko Kuwashima, Japanese voice actress
- December 13 – Tom DeLonge, American musician, author, and UFOlogist
- December 17
  - Nick Dinsmore, American professional wrestler
  - Susanthika Jayasinghe, Sri Lankan athlete
  - Hilje Murel, Estonian actress
  - Milla Jovovich, Ukrainian-born American actress and model
- December 18
  - Mara Carfagna, Italian politician and model
  - Sia, Australian singer-songwriter and music video director
  - Trish Stratus, Canadian professional wrestler and model
- December 20 – Bartosz Bosacki, Polish footballer
- December 21
  - Paloma Herrera, Argentine ballet dancer
  - Charles Michel, Belgian politician, 51st Prime Minister of Belgium and President of the European Council
- December 23 – Vadim Sharifijanov, Russian ice hockey player
- December 24 – Maria Zakharova, Russian politician and diplomat
- December 26
  - Ed Stafford, English explorer
  - Marcelo Ríos, Chilean tennis player
- December 27 – Heather O'Rourke, American child actress (d. 1988)
- December 29 – Shawn Hatosy, American actor
- December 30 – Tiger Woods, American golfer

== Deaths ==
=== January ===
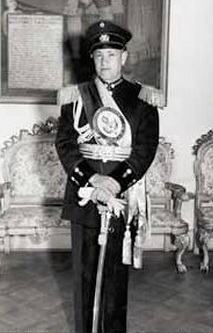
Gustavo Rojas Pinilla

- January 3 – Victor Kraft, Austrian philosopher (b. 1880)
- January 5 – Gottlob Berger, German Nazi senior official (b. 1896)
- January 8
  - Richard Tucker, American tenor (b. 1913)
  - David Marshall Williams, American inventor (b. 1900)
- January 9 – Pierre Fresnay, French actor (b. 1897)
- January 14 – Georgi Traykov, head of State of Bulgaria (b. 1898)
- January 17 – Gustavo Rojas Pinilla, 19th President of Colombia (b. 1900)
- January 19 – Thomas Hart Benton, American artist (b. 1889)
- January 23 – Prince Karl Franz of Prussia (b. 1916)
- January 24
  - Larry Fine, American actor and comedian, The Three Stooges (b. 1902)
  - Erich Kempka, German chauffeur, bodyguard of Adolf Hitler (b. 1910)
- January 28
  - Antonín Novotný, Czechoslovak Communist leader and 7th President of Czechoslovakia (b. 1904)
  - Ola Raknes, Norwegian psychoanalyst and philologist (b. 1887)

=== February ===
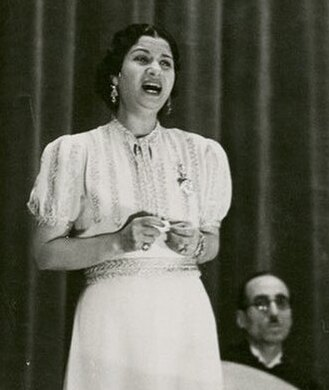
Umm Kulthum

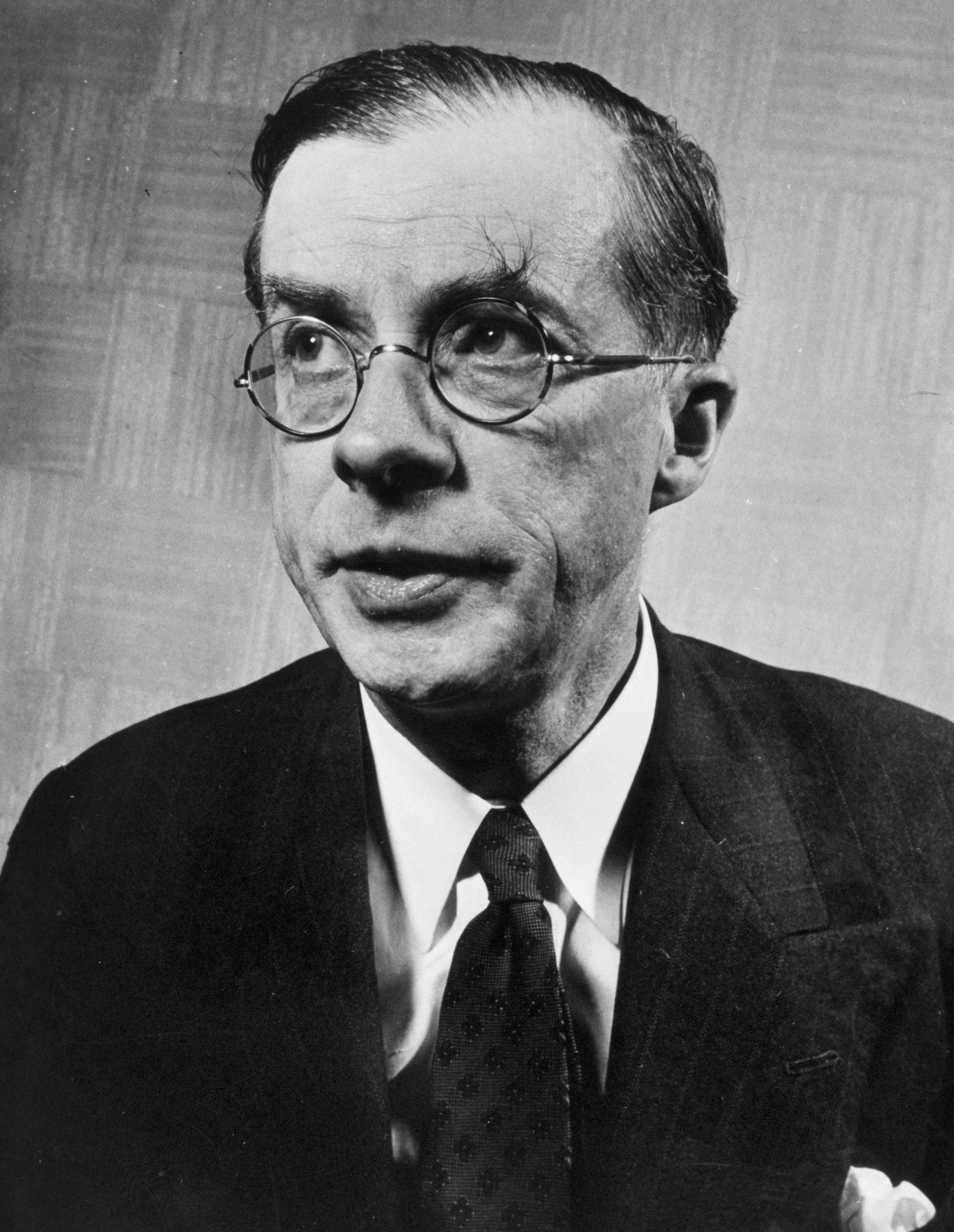
Sir Julian Huxley

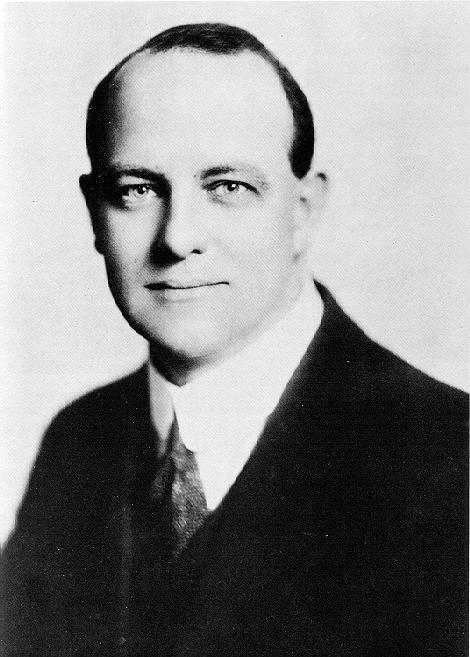
Sir P. G. Wodehouse

- February 3 – Umm Kulthum, Egyptian singer and actress (b. 1904)
- February 4 – Louis Jordan, American musician (b. 1908)
- February 6 – Sir Keith Park, New Zealand-born British air chief marshal (b. 1892)
- February 8
  - Sir Robert Robinson, British chemist, Nobel Prize laureate (b. 1886)
  - Jan Mukařovský, Czech literary, linguistic and aesthetic theorist. (b. 1891)
- February 9 – Sir Ivan Stedeford, British industrialist (b. 1897)
- February 10 – Dave Alexander, American musician (b. 1947)
- February 12 – Carl Lutz, Swiss diplomat and humanitarian (b. 1895)
- February 13 – André Beaufre, French general (b. 1902)
- February 14
  - Sir Julian Huxley, British biologist (b. 1887)
  - Sir P. G. Wodehouse, English writer (b. 1881)
- February 16 – Morgan Taylor, American Olympic athlete (b. 1903)
- February 17 – Hugo Österman, Finnish general (b. 1892)
- February 18 – Chivu Stoica, 48th Prime Minister of Romania and head of State (b. 1908)
- February 19 – Luigi Dallapiccola, Italian composer (b. 1904)
- February 22 – Lionel Tertis, English violist (b. 1876)
- February 24 – Nikolai Bulganin, Premier of the Soviet Union (b. 1895)
- February 25 – Elijah Muhammad, American Nation of Islam leader (b. 1897)
- February 28 – Sir Neville Cardus, British cricket and music writer (b. 1888)

=== March ===
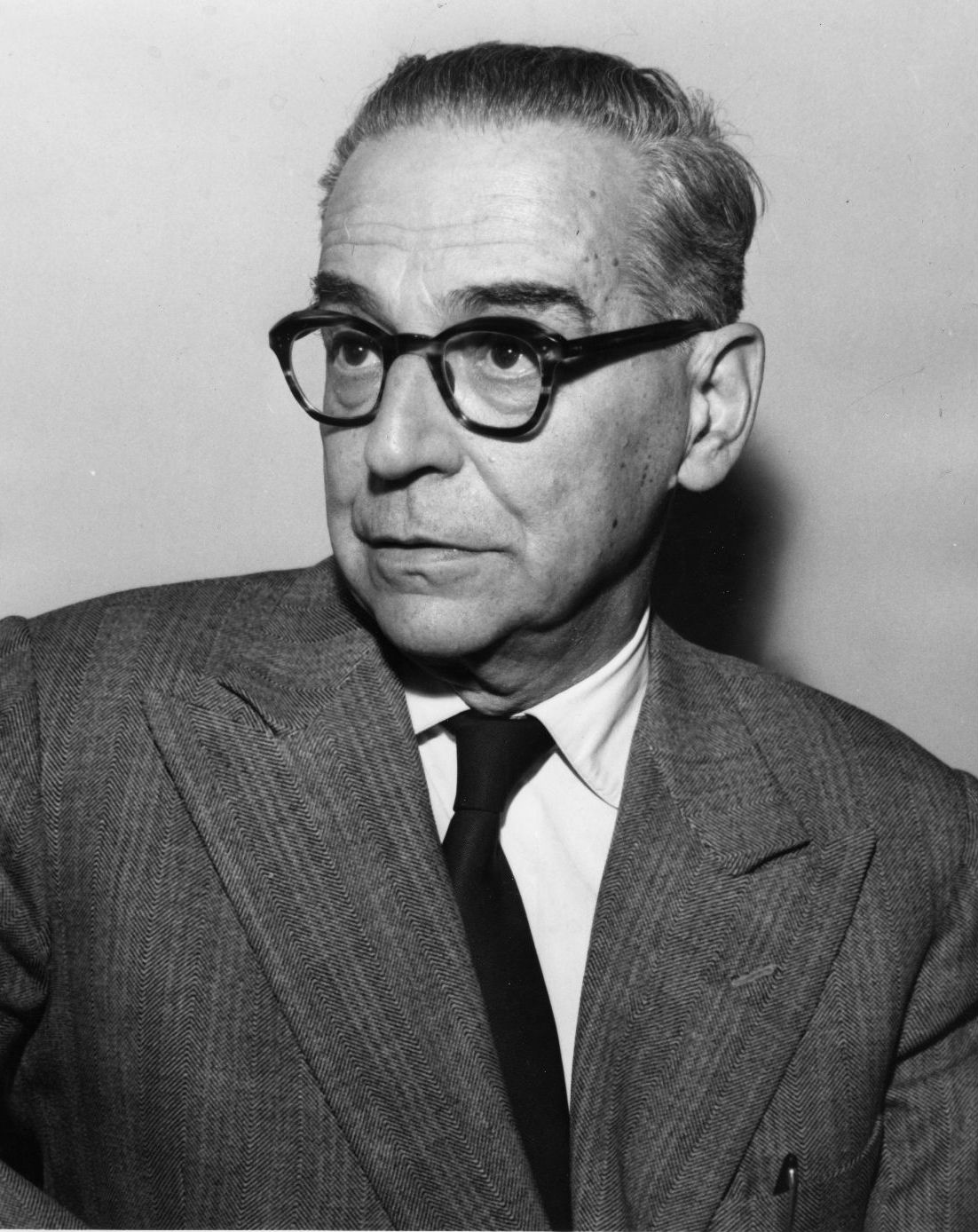
Ivo Andrić

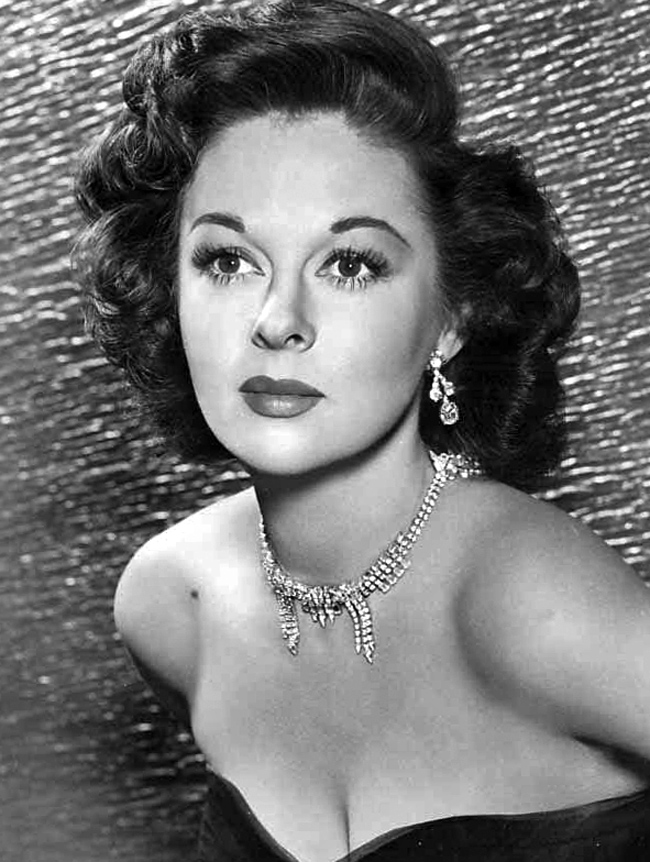
Susan Hayward

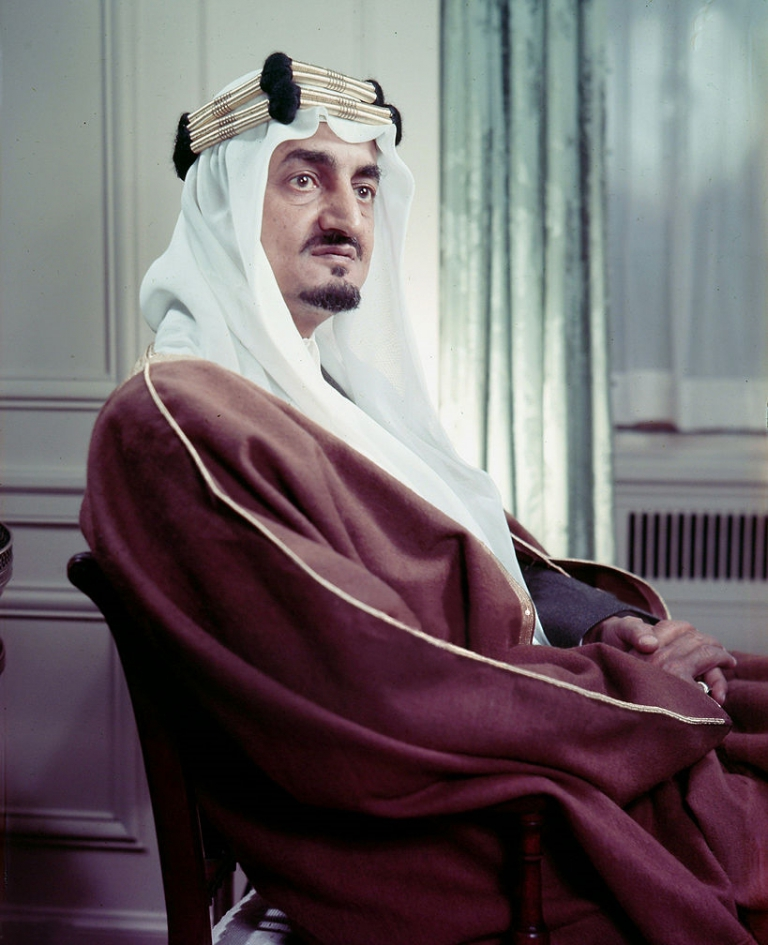
Faisal of Saudi Arabia

- March 2 – Madeleine Vionnet, French fashion designer (b. 1876)
- March 3 – Therese Giehse, German actress (b. 1898)
- March 4 – Bill Phillips, New Zealand economist (b. 1914)
- March 6 – Glenn Hardin, American athlete (b. 1910)
- March 7 – Mikhail Bakhtin, Russian philosopher and literary scholar (b. 1895)
- March 8
  - Joseph Bech, Prime Minister of Luxembourg (b. 1887)
  - George Stevens, American director, producer and cinematographer (b. 1904)
- March 9
  - Joseph Dunninger, American mentalist (b. 1892)
  - Shirley Ross, American actress and singer (b. 1913)
- March 11 – Margarita Fischer, American silent film actress (b. 1886)
- March 13 – Ivo Andrić, Serbo-Croatian writer, Nobel Prize laureate (b. 1892)
- March 14 – Susan Hayward, American actress (b. 1917)
- March 15 – Aristotle Onassis, Greek shipping magnate (b. 1906)
- March 16 – T-Bone Walker, American blues performer (b. 1910)
- March 20 – Infante Jaime, Duke of Segovia (b. 1908)
- March 21 – Joe Medwick, American baseball player and manager (b. 1911)
- March 25
  - King Faisal of Saudi Arabia (b. 1906)
  - Michèle Girardon, French actress (b. 1938)
- March 27 – Sir Arthur Bliss, British composer and Master of the Queen's Music (b. 1891)
- March 30 – Boots Adams, American business magnate, president of Phillips Petroleum Company (b. 1899)

=== April ===
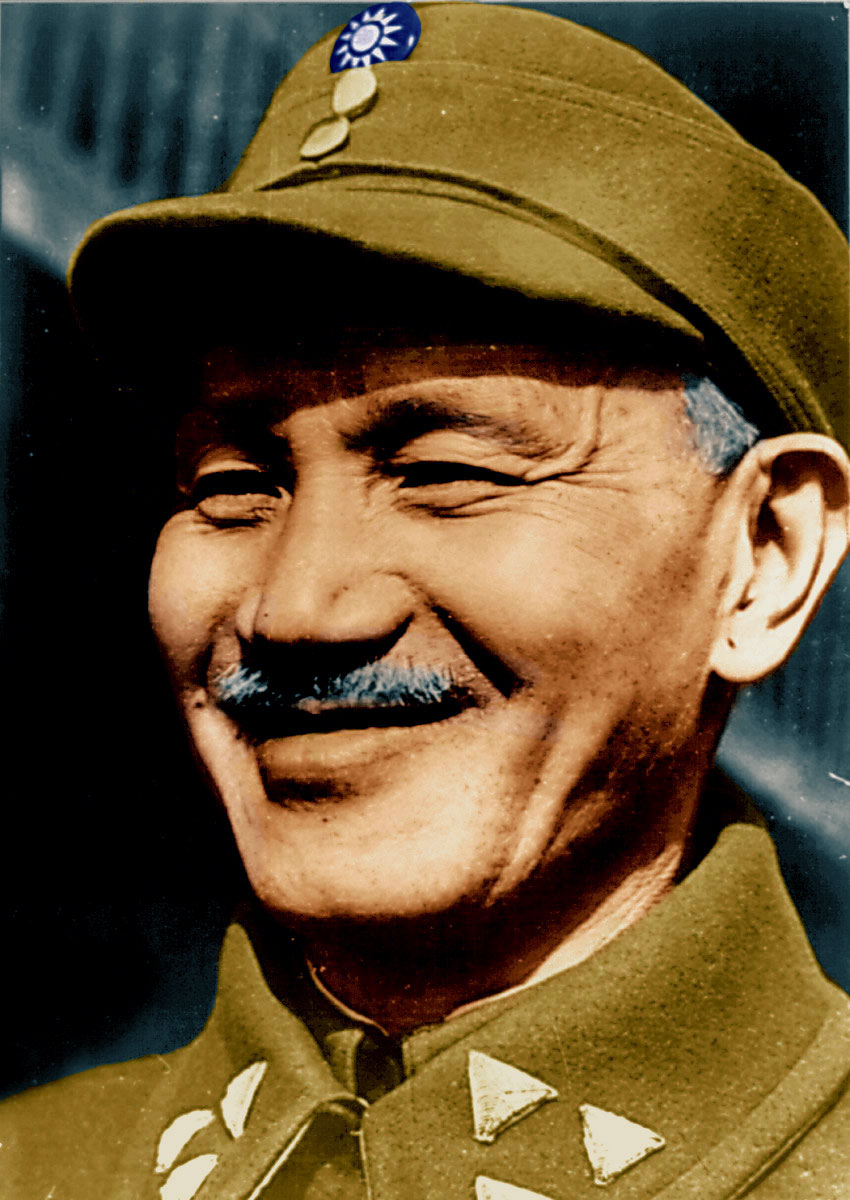
Chiang Kai-shek

- April 5
  - Chiang Kai-shek, Chinese nationalist general and politician, 1st President of the Republic of China (b. 1887)
  - Harold Osborn, American Olympic athlete (b. 1899)
  - Victor Marijnen, Dutch politician and jurist, 40th Prime Minister of the Netherlands (b. 1917)
- April 10
  - Walker Evans, American photographer (b. 1903)
  - Marjorie Main, American actress (b. 1890)
- April 12 – Josephine Baker, American-born French entertainer and activist (b. 1906)
- April 13 – Larry Parks, American actor (b. 1914)
- April 14 – Fredric March, American actor (b. 1897)
- April 17 – Sarvepalli Radhakrishnan, Indian philosopher and politician, 2nd President of India (b. 1888)
- April 19 – Percy Lavon Julian, American scientist (b. 1899)
- April 21 – Pascoal Ranieri Mazzilli, 2-time President of Brazil (b. 1910)
- April 23 – William Hartnell, English actor (b. 1908)
- April 24 – Pete Ham, Welsh singer, songwriter and guitarist (b. 1947)

=== May ===
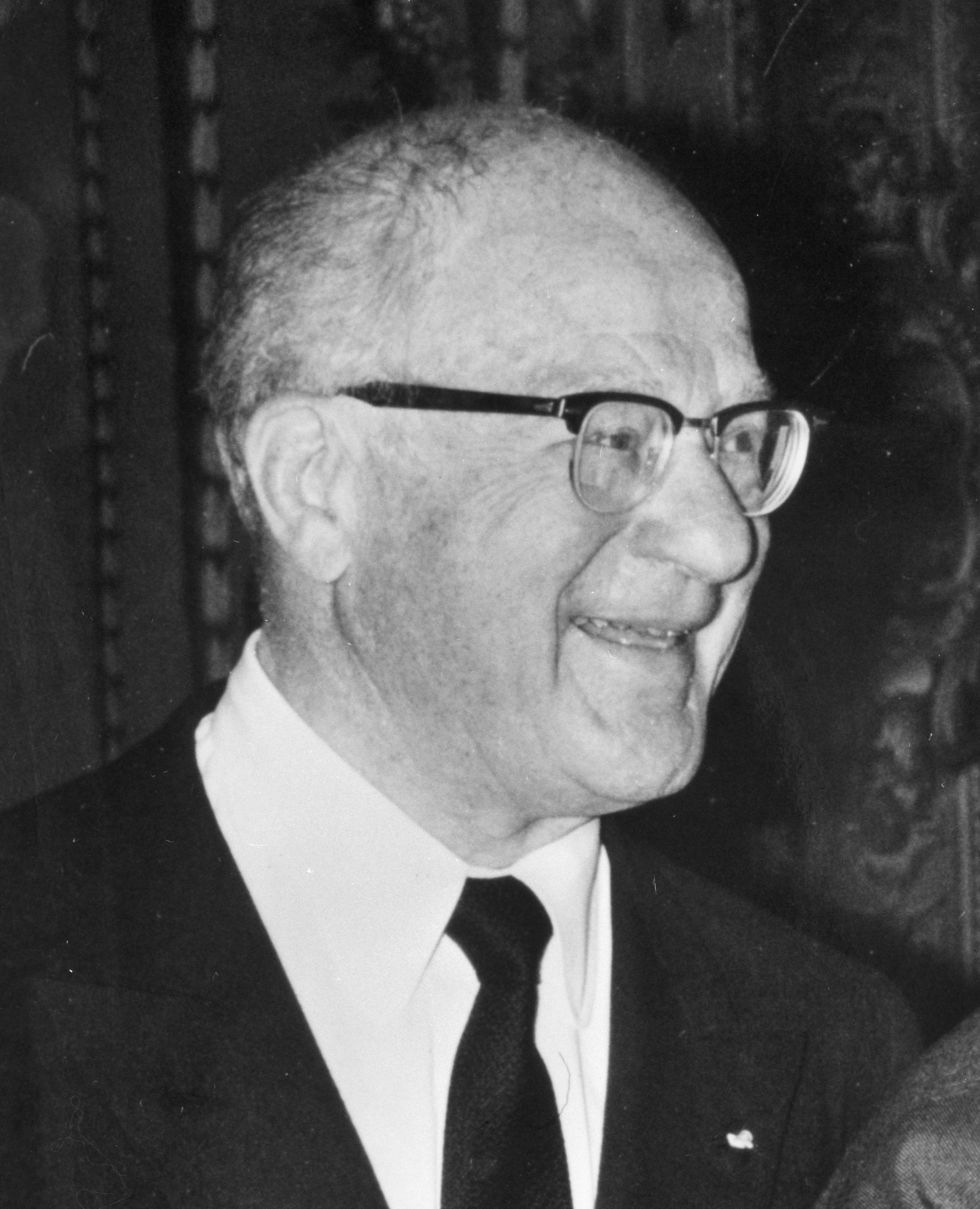
Avery Brundage

- May 4 – Moe Howard, American actor and comedian, The Three Stooges (b. 1897)
- May 8 – Avery Brundage, American administrator, 5th President of the International Olympic Committee (b. 1887)
- May 9 – Philip Dorn, Dutch actor (b. 1901)
- May 13 - Marguerite Perey, French physicist, discovered the element francium (b. 1909)
- May 14 – Ernst Alexanderson, Swedish-born American television pioneer (b. 1878)
- May 18
  - Leroy Anderson, American composer (b. 1908)
  - Aníbal Troilo, Argentine tango musician (b. 1914)
- May 20 – Dame Barbara Hepworth, English sculptor and artist (b. 1903)
- May 22
  - Lefty Grove, American baseball player (b. 1900)
  - Torben Meyer, Danish actor (b. 1884)
- May 23 – Moms Mabley, African-American comedian (b. 1894)
- May 28
  - Ezzard Charles, American boxer, World Heavyweight Champion (b. 1921)
  - Lung Chien, Chinese screenwriter and film director (b. 1916)
- May 30
  - Steve Prefontaine, American distance runner (b. 1951)
  - Michel Simon, Swiss actor (b. 1895)

=== June ===
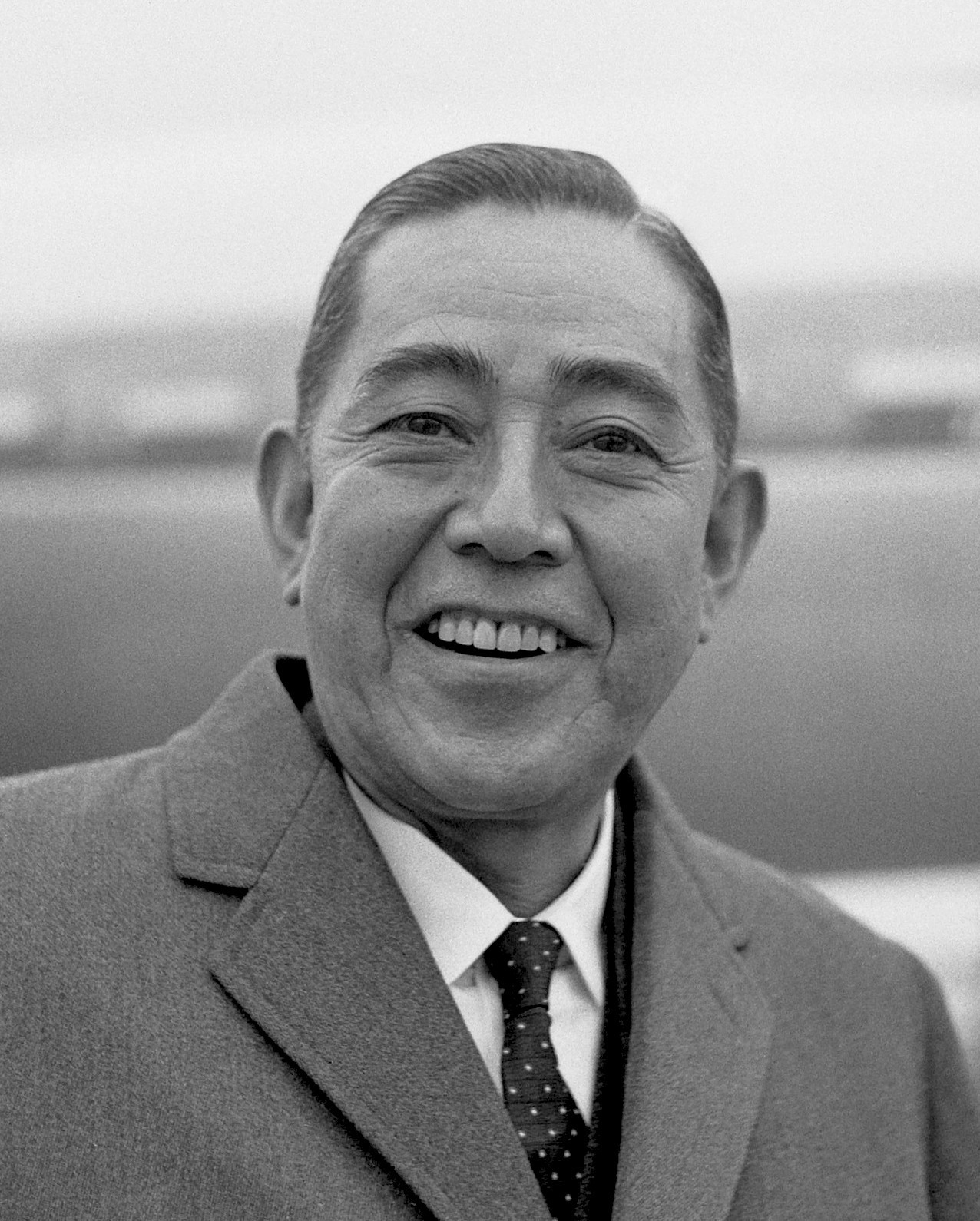
Eisaku Satō

- June 3
  - Eisaku Satō, Japanese politician, Prime Minister of Japan, recipient of the Nobel Peace Prize (b. 1901)
  - Ozzie Nelson, American actor, director and producer (b. 1906)
- June 4 – Evelyn Brent, American actress (b. 1895)
- June 5 – Paul Keres, Estonian chess player (b. 1916)
- June 9 – Albert Spencer, 7th Earl Spencer, British aristocrat (b. 1892)
- June 12 – Rafael Arévalo Martínez, Guatemalan writer (b. 1884)
- June 13 – José María Guido, 33rd President of Argentina (b. 1910)
- June 15 – William Austin, English actor (b. 1884)
- June 18 – Hugo Bergmann, German and Israeli Jewish philosopher (b. 1883)
- June 19 - Sam Giancana, Chicago mafia boss murdered in his own home. (b. 1908)
- June 26 – Josemaría Escrivá, Spanish Roman Catholic priest and saint (b. 1902)
- June 27 – G. I. Taylor, British physicist, mathematician and expert on fluid dynamics and wave theory (b. 1886)
- June 28 – Rod Serling, American television screenwriter and narrator (b. 1924)
- June 29 – Tim Buckley, American singer-songwriter (b. 1947)

=== July ===
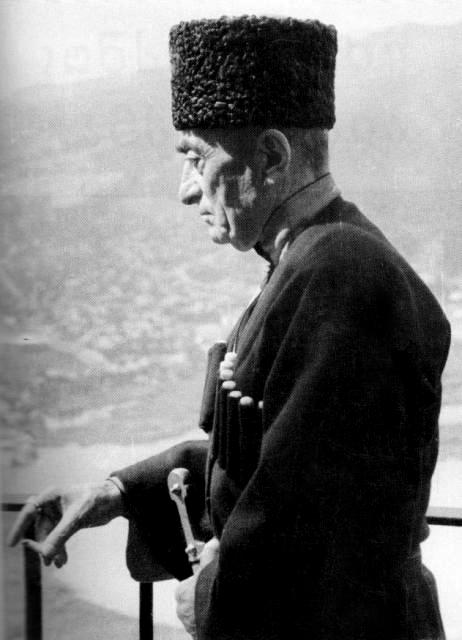
Konstantine Gamsakhurdia

- July 2 – James Robertson Justice, British actor (b. 1907)
- July 4 – Luigi Carlo Borromeo, Italian Roman Catholic bishop (b. 1893)
- July 5 – Otto Skorzeny, Austrian-born German lieutenant colonel (b. 1908)
- July 10 – Achille Van Acker, 33rd Prime Minister of Belgium (b. 1898)
- July 13 – Thomas Walter Swan, American jurist and judge on the United States Court of Appeals for the Second Circuit from 1926 until 1975 (b. 1877)
- July 14 – Madan Mohan, Indian music director (b. 1924)
- July 17 – Konstantine Gamsakhurdia, Georgian writer and public benefactor (b. 1893)
- July 19
  - Lefty Frizzell, American singer (b. 1928)
  - Charles Alan Pownall, American admiral, 3rd Military Governor of Guam (b. 1887)
- July 21 – Billy West, American actor (b. 1892)
- July 23 – Emlen Tunnell, American football player and coach (b. 1924)
- July 30 – James Blish, American science fiction and fantasy writer (b. 1921)

=== August ===
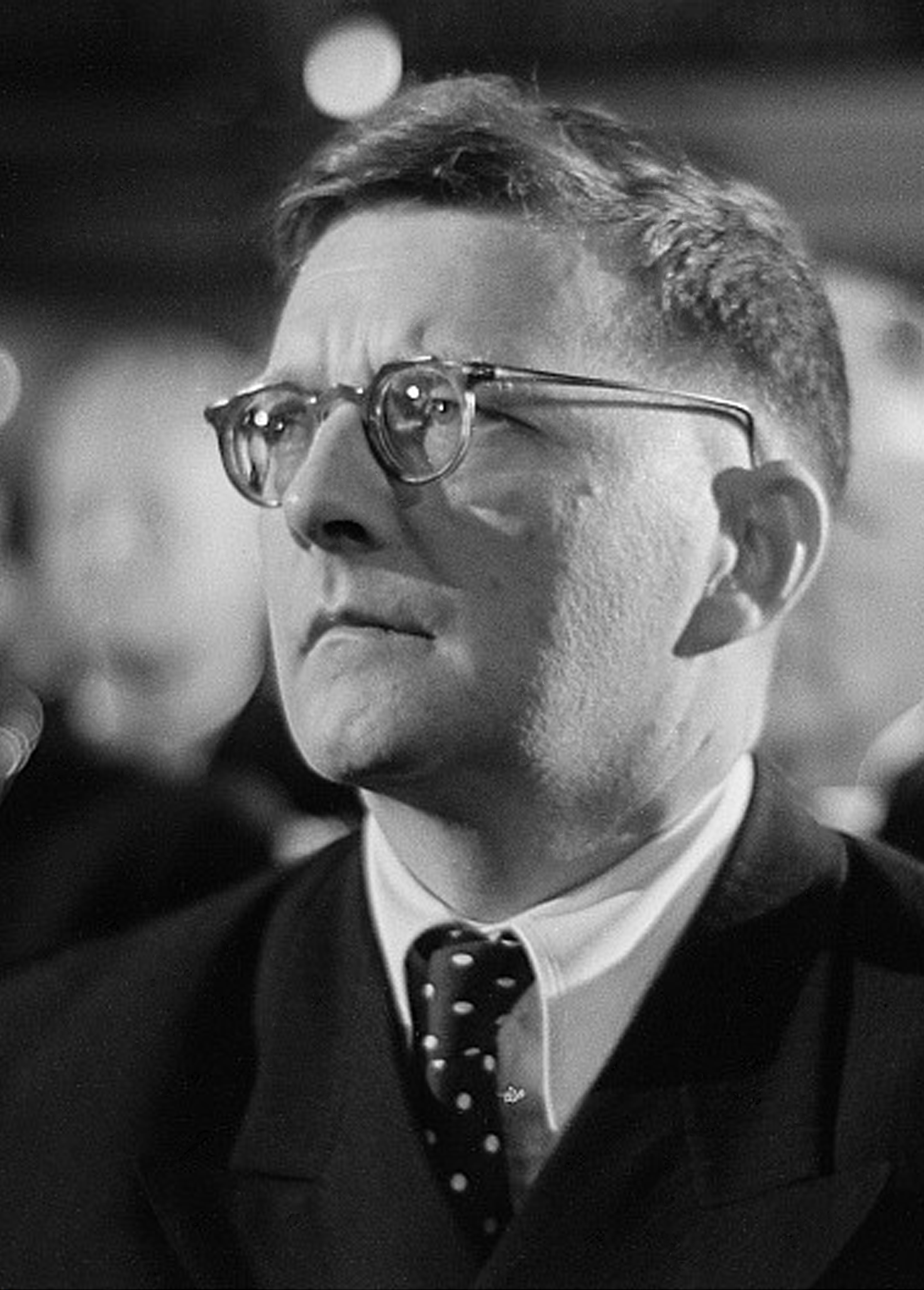
Dmitri Shostakovich

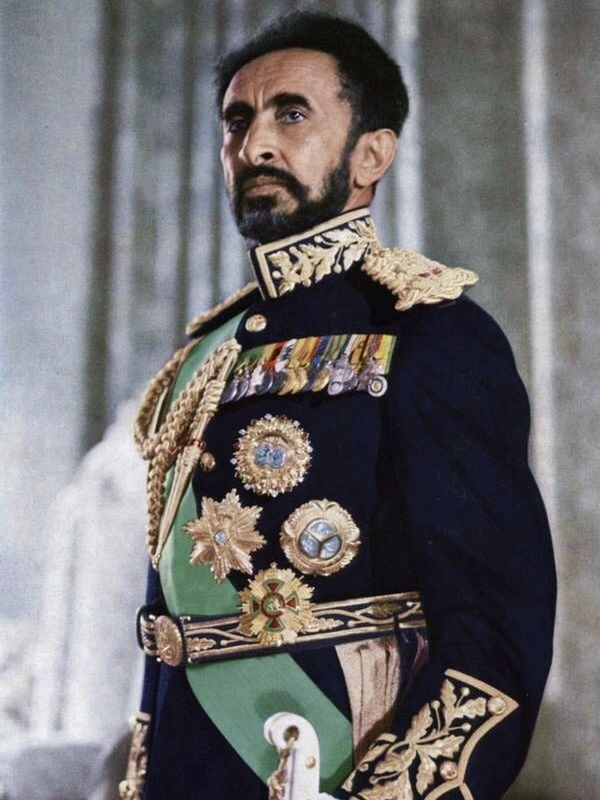
Haile Selassie I

- August 3
  - Andreas Embirikos, Greek poet (b. 1901)
  - Jack Molinas, American basketball player (b. 1931)
- August 6 – Infante Alfonso, Duke of Galliera, Spanish prince, military aviator (b. 1886)
- August 9 – Dmitri Shostakovich, Soviet and Russian composer (b. 1906)
- August 10 – Anthony McAuliffe, American general (b. 1898)
- August 11 – Rachel Katznelson-Shazar, Zionist political figure and wife of third President of Israel (b. 1885)
- August 15 – Sheikh Mujibur Rahman, 2nd Prime Minister of Bangladesh and 1st and 4th President of Bangladesh (b. 1920)
- August 16 – Vladimir Kuts, Soviet runner (b. 1927)
- August 17 – Sig Arno, German actor (b. 1895)
- August 19
  - Mark Donohue, American race car driver (b. 1937)
  - Ima Hogg, American society leader, philanthropist, patron and collector of the arts (b. 1882)
  - Frank Shields, American tennis player (b. 1909)
- August 23 – Sidney Buchman, American screenwriter (b. 1902)
- August 25 – Joseph Kane, American film director and producer (b. 1894)
- August 26 – Cullen Landis, American actor (b. 1896)
- August 27 – Haile Selassie I, Emperor of Ethiopia (b. 1892)
- August 28 – Fritz Wotruba, Austrian sculptor (b. 1907)
- August 29
  - Charles C. Bass, American physician and medical researcher (b. 1875)
  - Éamon de Valera, Irish politician and statesman, 3rd President of Ireland and 3-time Taoiseach (b. 1882)
- August 31 – Pierre Blaise, French film actor (b. 1955)

=== September ===
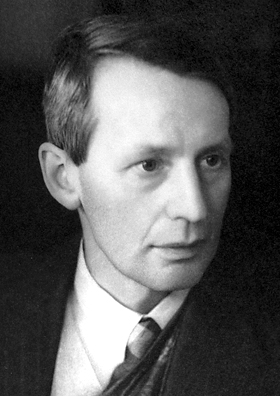
Sir George Paget Thomson

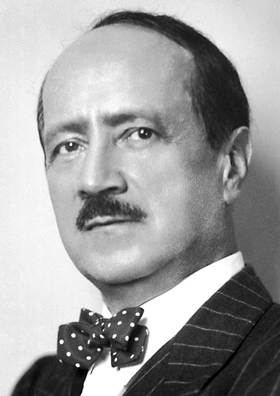
Saint-John Perse

- September 5 – Alice Catherine Evans, American microbiologist (b. 1881)
- September 9
  - Minta Durfee, American actress (b. 1889)
  - Ethel Griffies, British actress (b. 1878)
- September 10 – Sir George Paget Thomson, British physicist, Nobel Prize laureate (b. 1892)
- September 15 – Pavel Sukhoi, Soviet aerospace engineer, twice Hero of Socialist Labour (b. 1895)
- September 19 – Pamela Brown, English actress (b. 1917)
- September 20
  - Doria Shafik, Egyptian feminist, poet, writer and editor (b. 1908)
  - Saint-John Perse, French diplomat and writer, Nobel Prize laureate (b. 1887)
- September 23 – Ian Hunter, British actor (b. 1900)
- September 26 – C. H. Waddington, British biologist, paleontologist, geneticist and philosopher (b. 1905)
- September 27
  - Mark Frechette, American actor (b. 1947)
  - Jack Lang, Australian politician (b. 1876)
- September 29 – Casey Stengel, American baseball player and manager (b. 1890)

=== October ===
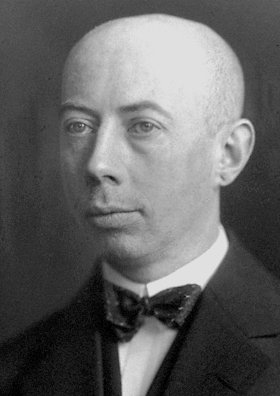
Gustav Ludwig Hertz

- October 3 – Guy Mollet, 94th Prime Minister of France (b. 1905)
- October 4 – May Sutton, American tennis champion (b. 1887)
- October 10 – Norman Levinson, American mathematician (b. 1912)
- October 16 – Don Barclay, American actor and artist (b. 1892)
- October 21 – Charles Reidpath, American athlete (b. 1889)
- October 22 – Arnold J. Toynbee, English historian (b. 1889)
- October 27
  - Peregrino Anselmo, Uruguayan football player (b. 1902)
  - Rex Stout, American author (b. 1886)
- October 28 – Georges Carpentier, French boxer (b. 1894)
- October 30 – Gustav Ludwig Hertz, German physicist, Nobel Prize laureate (b. 1887)

=== November ===
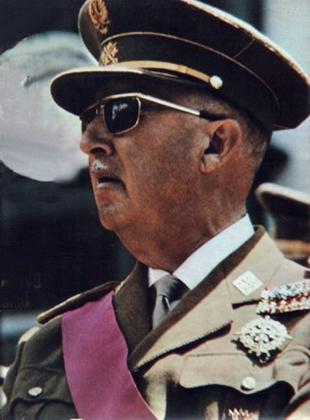
Francisco Franco

- November 1 – C. S. Wright, Canadian explorer (b. 1887)
- November 2 – Pier Paolo Pasolini, Italian film director (b. 1922)
- November 4 – Francis Dvornik, Czech historian (b. 1893)
- November 5
  - Edward Tatum, American geneticist, Nobel Prize laureate (b. 1909)
  - Lionel Trilling, American literary critic (b. 1905)
- November 6
  - Ernst Hanfstaengl, German-born American businessman and politician (b. 1887)
  - Annette Kellerman, Australian swimmer and actress (b. 1886)
- November 13 – R. C. Sherriff, English writer (b. 1896)
- November 17 – Kay Johnson, American actress (b. 1904)
- November 20 – Francisco Franco, Spanish general and politician, Caudillo of Spain (b. 1892)
- November 29
  - Tony Brise, English racing driver (b. 1952)
  - Graham Hill, English racing driver (b. 1929)

=== December ===
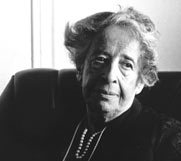
Hannah Arendt

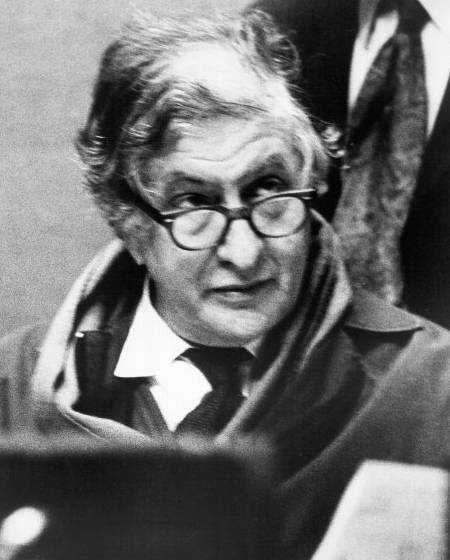
Bernard Herrmann

- December 4 – Hannah Arendt, German political theorist (b. 1906)
- December 7 – Thornton Wilder, American playwright (b. 1897)
- December 8 – Plínio Salgado, Brazilian politician and writer (b. 1895)
- December 9 – William A. Wellman, American film director (b. 1896)
- December 10 – Boy Charlton, Australian Olympic swimmer (b. 1907)
- December 11 – Nihal Atsız, Turkish ultranationalist writer, novelist, and poet (b. 1905)
- December 12 – Saadi Al Munla, 4th Prime Minister of Lebanon (b. 1890)
- December 13 – Addie Viola Smith, American lawyer and trade commissioner (b. 1893)
- December 14 – Arthur Treacher, English actor (b. 1894)
- December 15
  - Alex Aronson, Jewish-Dutch aid worker (b. 1934)
  - Shigeyoshi Inoue, Japanese admiral (b. 1889)
- December 17 – Noble Sissle, American jazz composer (b. 1889)
- December 18 – Theodosius Dobzhansky, Ukrainian-American geneticist and evolutionary biologist (b. 1900)
- December 19 – René Maheu, French professor and administrator, 6th Director-General of UNESCO (b. 1905)
- December 20 – William Lundigan, American actor (b. 1914)
- December 21 – Rowland V. Lee, American film director (b. 1891)
- December 24 – Bernard Herrmann, American composer (b. 1911)
- December 30 – Elene Akhvlediani, Soviet painter (b. 1901)

=== Date unknown ===
- Sisowath Monireth, 3rd Prime Minister of Cambodia (b. 1909)

== Nobel Prizes ==

- Physics – Aage Bohr, Ben Roy Mottelson, James Rainwater
- Chemistry – John Cornforth, Vladimir Prelog
- Medicine – David Baltimore, Renato Dulbecco, Howard Martin Temin
- Literature – Eugenio Montale
- Peace – Andrei Dmitrievich Sakharov
- Economics – Leonid Kantorovich, Tjalling Koopmans
