= 38th Festival Film Bandung =

2025 film and television awards

- Presented by: Forum Film Bandung
- Date: 31 October 2025
- Site: Gedung Budaya Sabilulungan, Soreang, Bandung Regency, West Java, Indonesia
- Official website: festivalfilmbandung.com

Highlights
- Best Picture: Sore: A Wife from the Future

The 38th Festival Film Bandung, presented by the Forum Film Bandung, honored the achievements in Indonesian film and television industry from 1 September 2024 to 31 August 2025. The ceremony was held on 31 October 2025 at the Gedung Budaya Sabilulungan, Soreang, Bandung Regency, West Java, Indonesia.

Romantic science fantasy film Sore: A Wife from the Future won the Highly Commended Film and two other awards. Netflix family drama series Losmen Bu Broto: The Series won the Highly Commended Web Series.

== Winners and nominees ==
The nominations were announced on 15 September 2025.

Winners are listed first, highlighted in boldface, and indicated with a double dagger (‡).

=== Film ===
**Highly Commended Film**: **Sore: A Wife from the Future**‡; Jumbo; Komang; Siapa Dia; The Siege at Thorn High	**Highly Commended Director**: **Naya Anindita – Komang**‡; Ryan Adriandhy – Jumbo; Sabrina Rochelle Kalangie – Home Sweet Loan; Timo Tjahjanto – The Shadow Strays; Yandy Laurens – Sore: A Wife from the Future
**Highly Commended Leading Actor**: **Morgan Oey – The Siege at Thorn High as Edwin**‡; Chicco Kurniawan – A Brother and 7 Siblings as Moko; Nicholas Saputra – Siapa Dia as Layar / Nicolas / Kabel / Saputra; Omara Esteghlal – Better Off Dead as Gema; Ringgo Agus Rahman – Call Me Dad as Dedi	**Highly Commended Leading Actress**: **Aurora Ribero – Komang as Komang**‡; **Sheila Dara Aisha – Sore: A Wife from the Future as Sore**‡; Acha Septriasa – Qodrat 2 as Azizah; Ariel Tatum – This City Is a Battlefield as Fatimah; Yunita Siregar – Home Sweet Loan as Kaluna
**Highly Commended Supporting Actor**: **Jerome Kurnia – This City Is a Battlefield as Hazil**‡; Andri Mashadi – The Shadow Strays as Ariel; Bima Azriel – All We Need Is Time as Ombak; Fatih Unru – Risky Business as Marwan; Juan Bio One – Sayap-Sayap Patah 2: Olivia as Askar	**Highly Commended Supporting Actress**: **Raihaanun – Gowok: Javanese Kamasutra as Ratri Sujita**‡; Amanda Rawles – A Brother and 7 Siblings as Maurin; Anantya Kirana – Only Your Name in My Prayers as Nala; Maizura – 3 Men's Soulmates as Nisa; Unique Priscilla – Perayaan Mati Rasa as Dini
**Highly Commended Screenplay**: **Jumbo – Ryan Adriandhy and Widya Arifianti**‡; All We Need Is Time – Teddy Soeria Atmadja; Better Off Dead – Kristo Immanuel and Jessica Tjiu; Komang – Evelyn Afnilia; Sore: A Wife from the Future – Yandy Laurens	**Highly Commended Cinematography**: **This City Is a Battlefield – Roy Lolang**‡; Gowok: Javanese Kamasutra – Barmastya Bhumi Brawijaya and Satria Kurnianto; The Shadow Strays – Batara Goempar; The Siege at Thorn High – Ical Tanjung; Sore: A Wife from the Future – Dimas Bagus Triatma Yoga
**Highly Commended Art Direction**: **Siapa Dia – Edy Wibowo**‡; The Secret Recipe – Andang Apri Hardanto; The Shadow Strays – Antonius Boedy; The Siege at Thorn High – Toni Ortega and Dennis Sutanto; This City Is a Battlefield – Frans X. R. Paat	**Highly Commended Editing**: **The Shadow Strays – Dinda Amanda**‡; Gowok: Javanese Kamasutra – Haris F. Syah and Wawan I. Wibowo; Home Sweet Loan – Aline Jusria; The Siege at Thorn High – Joko Anwar, Erwin Prasetya Kurniawan, and Teguh Raharjo; Sore: A Wife from the Future – Hendra Adhi Susanto
**Highly Commended Original Score**: **Sore: A Wife from the Future – Ofel Obaja Setiawan**‡; Perayaan Mati Rasa – Andi Rianto; The Secret Recipe – Mondo Gascaro and Nic Edwin; The Siege at Thorn High – Aghi Narottama; This City Is a Battlefield – Yudhi Arfani and Zeke Khaseli	**Highly Commended International Film**: Highly Commended Comedy Drama Film: Companion; Highly Commended Conspiracy Drama Film: Conclave; Highly Commended Action Film: F1; Highly Commended Adventure Animation Film: Flow; Highly Commended Political Drama Film: I'm Still Here; Highly Commended Historical Horror Film: Sinners; Highly Commended Psychological Thriller Film: The Substance; Highly Commended Mystery Film: Weapons; Highly Commended Musical Drama Film: Wicked; Highly Commended Family Animation Film: The Wild Robot

=== Television and Web ===
**Highly Commended Web Series**: **Losmen Bu Broto the Series (Netflix)**‡; Aku Tak Membenci Hujan (Viu); Arab Maklum 3: Girl from Dubai (Vision+); Bad Guys (Vidio); Sekotengs (Prime Video)	**Highly Commended Director for a Web Series**: **Razka Robby Ertanto – Sekotengs (Prime Video)**‡; Asep Kusdinar – Ranah Pusaka (Viu); Ferry Pei Irawan and William Chandra – Bad Guys (Vidio); Rudy Soedjarwo – Jangan Salahkan Aku Selingkuh (WeTV); Sidharta Tata and Fajar Martha Santosa – Zona Merah (Vidio)
**Highly Commended Leading Actor in a Web Series**: **Nino Fernandez – Duren Jatuh as Julian (WeTV)**‡; Abun Sungkar – Saudade as Akash (Viu); Arya Vasco – Dendam as James (Vision+); Darius Sinathrya – Sugar Daddy as Derry (Viu / Vision+); Jeff Smith – Aku Tak Membenci Hujan as Karang (Viu)	**Highly Commended Leading Actress in a Web Series**: **Cinta Laura – Dendam as Renata (Vision+)**‡; Luna Maya – Main Api as Nadine (WeTV); Marshanda – Jangan Salahkan Aku Selingkuh as Anna (WeTV); Tatjana Saphira – Roman Dendam as Tiana (Vidio); Yasmin Napper – Cinta dalam Sujudku as Zahra (Vidio)
**Highly Commended Actor in a Television Series**: **Erwin Cortez – Kupu Malam as Ardian (MDTV)**‡; Arya Mohan – Asmara Gen Z as Mohan (SCTV); Billy Davidson – Luka Cinta as William (SCTV); Lucky Perdana – Terbelenggu Rindu as Biru (RCTI); Rionaldo Stockhorst – Ketika Cinta Memanggilmu as Aksara (SCTV)	**Highly Commended Actress in a Television Series**: **Faradina Tika – Kupu Malam as Marsha (MDTV)**‡; Aqeela Calista – Asmara Gen Z as Aqeela (SCTV); Dinda Kirana – Luka Cinta as Salma (SCTV); Haico Van der Veken – Mencintaimu Sekali Lagi as Arini (RCTI); Voke Victoria – Terbelenggu Rindu as Vernie (RCTI)
**Highly Commended Supporting Actor in a Web Series**: **Devano Danendra – Zona Merah as (Vidio)**‡; Baskara Mahendra – Losmen Bu Broto the Series as Tarjo (Netflix); Brandon Salim – True Stalker as Ghaliandra (Vidio); Randy Pangalila – Bad Guys as Haidar (Vidio); Stefan William – Jangan Salahkan Aku Selingkuh as Reyhan (WeTV)	**Highly Commended Supporting Actress in a Web Series**: **Mona Ratuliu – Aku Tak Membenci Hujan as Andira (Viu)**‡; Aura Kasih – Gelas Kaca as Gita (Vidio); Fanny Ghassani – Arab Maklum 3: Girl from Dubai as Maysarah (Vision+); Maudy Effrosina – Bad Guys as Sekar (Vidio); Ruth Marini – Zona Merah as Dyah Ayu Maharani (Vidio)

=== Special awards ===
- Special Award for Inspirational Animation Film: Jumbo
- Lifetime Achievement Award: Mathias Muchus
