= 39th Festival Film Bandung =

2026 film and television awards

- Official poster
- Presented by: Forum Film Bandung
- Date: 22 August 2026
- Site: Horison Ultima Hotel, Bandung
- Hosted by: Fizi Andrean
- Official website: festivalfilmbandung.com

Highlights
- Best Picture: On Your Lap
- Most awards: On Your Lap (3)
- Most nominations: Dopamine (7)

Television coverage
- Network: YouTube

The 39th Festival Film Bandung, presented by the Forum Film Bandung, honored the achievements in Indonesian film and television industry from 1 September 2025 to 30 June 2026. The ceremony was advanced from its usual October-November dates. It was held on 22 August 2026.

== Nominations ==
The nominations were announced on 16 July 2026.

Winners are listed first, highlighted in boldface, and indicated with a double dagger (‡).

=== Film ===
**Highly Commended Film**: **On Your Lap ‡**; Children of Heaven; Dopamine; Levitating; Nobody Loves Kay	**Highly Commended Director**: **Reza Rahadian – On Your Lap ‡**; Dinna Jasanti – Senin Harga Naik; Hanung Bramantyo – Children of Heaven; Joko Anwar – Ghost in the Cell; Wregas Bhanuteja – Levitating
**Highly Commended Leading Actor**: **Jared Ali – Children of Heaven as Ali ‡**; **Reza Rahadian – Semua akan Baik-Baik Saja as Langit ‡**; Angga Yunanda – Dopamine as Malik; Vino G. Bastian – Tanah Runtuh as Idham; Yusuf Mahardika – Crocodile Tears as Johan	**Highly Commended Leading Actress**: **Claresta Taufan – On Your Lap as Sartika ‡**; Amanda Rawles – Andai Ibu Tidak Menikah dengan Ayah as Alin; Marissa Anita – Crocodile Tears as Mama; Marsha Timothy – Twisted Fate as Anindita; Shenina Cinnamon – Dopamine as Alya
**Highly Commended Supporting Actor**: **Aming – Ghost in the Cell as Tokek ‡**; Didik Nini Thowok – Sleep No More as Maryati; Donny Damara – The Elixir as Sadimin; Indra Birowo – Levitating as Bayu's father; Rey Bong – Nobody Loves Kay as Ido	**Highly Commended Supporting Actress**: **Meriam Bellina – Senin Harga Naik as Retno ‡**; Christine Hakim – On Your Lap as Maya; Eva Celia – Andai Ibu Tidak Menikah dengan Ayah as Anis; Raihaanun – Semua Akan Baik-Baik Saja as Bintang; Sarah Sechan – Wait Until I Make It as Yuli
**Highly Commended Screenplay**: **Nobody Loves Kay – Johanna Wattimena and Bernardus Raka ‡**; Dopamine – Teddy Soeria Atmadja; Levitating – Wregas Bhanuteja, Alicia Angelina, and Defi Mahendra; Mothernet – Gina S. Noer, Diva Apresya, and Melarissa Sjarief; On Your Lap – Reza Rahadian and Felix K. Nesi	**Highly Commended Cinematography**: **Dopamine – Vera Lestafa ‡**; Children of Heaven – Faozan Rizal; Ikatan Darah – Ferry Rusli; Semua Akan Baik-Baik Saja – Yudi Datau; Tanah Runtuh – Rudy Soedjarwo
**Highly Commended Art Direction**: **Na Willa – Rini Sri Handayani ‡**; Children of Heaven – Bramantya Agusta; Ghost in the Cell – Dennis Sutanto; On Your Lap – Eros Eflin; Semua Akan Baik-Baik Saja – Allan Sebastian	**Highly Commended Editing**: **Dopamine – Aline Jusria ‡**; Andai Ibu Tidak Menikah dengan Ayah – Ryan Purwoko; Ghost in the Cell – Joko Anwar; Timur – Akhmad Fesdi Anggoro and Arifin Cu'unk; Twisted Fate – Ahmad Yuniardi
**Highly Commended Original Score**: **Na Willa – Ofel Obaja ‡**; Dopamine – Ricky Lionardi; Levitating – Yennu Ariendra; Nobody Loves Kay – Yudhi Arfani and Zeke Khaseli; Rangga & Cinta – Melly Goeslaw and Anto Hoed	**Highly Commended International Film**: **Action: The Furious**; **Action Thriller: One Battle After Another**; **Animated: Hoppers**; **Cultural Epic Drama: Kokuho**; **Detective Comedy: The Sheep Detectives**; **Historical Romance Drama: Hamnet**; **Mystery Horror: Hokum**; **Psychological Horror: Backrooms**; **Science Fiction: Project Hail Mary**; **Sports Drama: Marty Supreme**; **Thriller: It Was Just an Accident**

=== Television and Web ===
**Highly Commended Web Series**: **Ganteng-Ganteng Genteng: Kontes Otot Paling Viral (Vidio) ‡**; Made with Love (Netflix); Ratu Ratu Queens: The Series (Netflix); Rintik Terakhir (Viu); Secret High School (Viu)	**Highly Commended Director for a Web Series**: **Lucky Kuswandi – Ratu Ratu Queens: The Series (Netflix) ‡**; Eman Pradipta – Generasi D'Bijis (Vidio); Farid Dermawan – Secret High School (Viu); Sondang Pratama – Rintik Terakhir (Viu); Teddy Soeria Atmadja – Made with Love (Netflix)
**Highly Commended Leading Actor in a Web Series**: **Yesaya Abraham – Secret High School as Shaka (Viu) ‡**; Bucek – Operation Wedding as Sukardi (MAXstream); Fadi Alaydrus – Tiba-Tiba Brondong as Langit (Viu); Jefri Nichol – Pertaruhan the Series as Elzan (Vidio); Samo Rafael – Still Single as Yudha (Vision+)	**Highly Commended Leading Actress in a Web Series**: **Wulan Guritno – Mama-Mama Pengejar Cinta as Adia (Vidio) ‡**; Aisyah Aqilah – Rintik Terakhir as Launa (Viu); Mawar Eva de Jongh – Made with Love as Luka (Netflix); Nirina Zubir – Ratu Ratu Queens: The Series as Party (Netflix); Yuki Kato – Still Single as Maya (Vision+)
**Highly Commended Actor in a Television Series**: **Fendy Chow – Terikat Janji as Dipa (RCTI) ‡**; Arbani Yasiz – Keluarga yang Tak Dirindukan as Thoriq (MDTV); Arya Saloka – Terikat Janji as Sena (RCTI); Kenny Austin – Cinta Sepenuh Jiwa as Hasbi (RCTI); Rayn Wijaya – Beri Cinta Waktu as Ramadani (SCTV)	**Highly Commended Actress in a Television Series**: **Adhisty Zara – Beri Cinta Waktu as Adila (SCTV) ‡**; Asha Assuncao – Terikat Janji as Davina (RCTI); Cut Syifa – Cinta Sepenuh Jiwa as Lala (RCTI); Michelle Ziudith – Jejak Duka Diandra as Diandra (SCTV); Rachquel Nesia – Turun Ranjang as Naza (RCTI)
**Highly Commended Supporting Actor in a Web Series**: **Randy Martin – Generasi D'Bijis as Julian (Vidio) ‡**; Cinta Brian – Tiba-Tiba Brondong as Giandra (Viu); Elang El Gibran – Pertaruhan the Series as Elang (Vidio); Rafly Altama – Ganteng-Ganteng Genteng: Kontes Otot Paling Viral as Ujang (Vidio); Richard Gibson – Mama-Mama Pengejar Cinta as Hugo (Vidio)	**Highly Commended Supporting Actress in a Web Series**: **Alexandra Gottardo – Balas Dendam Istri yang Tak Dianggap as Sandra (WeTV) ‡**; Asri Welas – Ratu Ratu Queens: The Series as Biyah (Netflix); Maria Theodore – Jalinan Terlarang as Gina (Vidio); Masayu Anastasia – Mama-Mama Pengejar Cinta as Ibel (Vidio); Sha Ine Febriyanti – Made with Love as Sari (Netflix)

=== Special awards ===
- **Lifetime Achievement Award: Christine Hakim**
