= Luka Cinta =

Indonesian drama television series

- Genre: Melodrama; Romance
- Screenplay by: Serena Luna
- Story by: Serena Luna
- Directed by: Epoy S. Pradipta
- Starring: Dinda Kirana; Jerome Kurnia; Billy Davidson; Anjani Dina; Haviza Devi Anjani; Bizael Tanasale; Natasha Dewanti; Unique Priscilla; Hans Hosman; Selvi Kitty; Sutan Simatupang; Devina Aureel; Rudi Kawilarang; Ike Muti; Adjie Pangestu; Rizky Tama; Ikbal Fauzi; Billy Boedjanger; Jihane Almira Chedid; Teuku Ryan; Marchia Pohan; Anastasya Panggabean; Vicky Kalea; Brooklyn Alif Rea
- Theme music composer: Ade Govinda, Nabila V.
- Opening theme: "Masing-Masing" by Ernie Zakri, Ade Govinda
- Ending theme: "Masing-Masing" by Ernie Zakri, Ade Govinda
- Composer: Wiwiex Soedarno
- Country of origin: Indonesia
- Original language: Indonesian
- No. of seasons: 1
- No. of episodes: 334

Production
- Executive producer: David S. Suwarto
- Producer: Iwan S. Manan
- Cinematography: Memet Nakesh
- Editors: Dwi Indah; Deni Surajab; Tedy Gunawan; Hendrajat; Basofi
- Camera setup: Multi-camera
- Running time: 90 minutes
- Production company: SinemArt

Original release
- Network: SCTV; Vidio
- Release: 2 September 2024 – 1 August 2025

Luka Cinta is an Indonesian television series which aired from 2 September 2024 to 1 August 2025 on SCTV and streams on Vidio. Produced by SinemArt, it stars Dinda Kirana, Jerome Kurnia, and Billy Davidson.

== Plot ==
Salma is a beautiful, spirited girl who is strong and independent. Although she is a strong woman, she has not lost the innocence and femininity that made so many boys fall in love with her. However, Salma always rejects men who approach her. This is because Salma has a past trauma.

Raised in a violent family also made Salma an introvert. Salma herself only had two best friends when she was 13: Dinda and Argo. From then on, Argo fell in love with Salma. Argo's feelings were never realized by Salma. Only Dinda knew. She always supported them both. But Argo was too insecure and asked Dinda never to tell Salma.

When Salma was 15, Salma tried to defend her mother from being beaten by her father. But Salma ended up being the victim. This is what led Wita (Salma's mother) to finally agree to leave her father, Ridwan. They ran away without even saying goodbye to Argo and Dinda. A new chapter in Salma's life began. Now Salma and Wita lived together. And time passed.

Salma grew into a strong adult, having to be a strength for her mother, who still often cried and missed her father, once again for love, even though that love had caused much pain in their lives. From there, Salma's determination not to easily give in to men grew.

Salma then landed an internship at a company as an HR staff member. Salma's beautiful and youthful appearance attracted Airlangga, the company's boss. Salma always firmly refused, knowing Airlangga was married. This only made Airlangga even more curious. Eventually, Airlangga trapped her.

Salma nearly had an accident. At that moment, she was helped by a handsome man who happened to be passing by. The man was William. William was very gentlemanly and sweet to her. From that day on, Salma, who immediately decided to quit her job, faced many difficulties.

But William helped her. Plus, it turns out that Salma's best friend, Dinda, works at William's company. This gives William a way to approach Salma. Salma has no idea that Dinda is secretly in love with William.

== Cast ==
=== Main ===
- Dinda Kirana as Salma Kirana Dewi
- Jerome Kurnia as Argo Bayu Dirgantara
- Billy Davidson as William Andrew Prawira

=== Recurring ===
- Anjani Dina as Dinda Anjani
- Haviza Devi Anjani as Irish Andrea Prawira
- Bizael Tanasale as Erlangga Kusuma
- Natasha Dewanti as Ayunda Anggraini
- Baiti Syaghaf as Indira
- Unique Priscilla as Erwita Triasih
- Hans Hosman as Calvin Mahesa
- Selvi Kitty as Dewi
- Sutan Simatupang as Ridwan Kuncoro
- Devina Aureel as Azizah Solihin
- Rudi Kawilarang as Erwin Prawira
- Ike Muti as Tania Prawira
- Adjie Pangestu as Brata
- Rizky Tama as Sammy
- Ikbal Fauzi as Wirasena Roy Sanjaya
- Azalea Iskandar as Lilia Lestari
- Billy Boedjanger as Guntur
- Munggaran Meldrat as Andika Maulana
- Muhammad Fauzan as Argo remaja
- Ricky Lucky as Ben
- Jihane Almira Chedid as Kinariyosih Asri Kinanti
- Teuku Ryan as Jerry
- Marchia Pohan as Hera
- Noel Hutabarat as Taufan
- Lily Zalea as Marina Sulistya
- Yumi Kwandy as Shakira
- Sarah Chumaira as Salma
- Audya Ananta as Shakira Amanda
- Ginzha Mikhaila as Jolly
- Asyraaf Barawas as William
- Brooklyn R. as Irish
- Helsa Dzakira Aulia as Dinda
- Anton Pradhana as Dion
- Luluk Nuril as Sisil
- Anastasya Panggabean as Syifa Mahesa Janetta
- Hayu Pangastuti as ibu Andi
- Elkie Kwee as Faisal Mahesa
- Adi Sudirja as Yatno
- Vicky Kalea as Yudi

== Production ==
=== Casting ===
Dinda Kirana confirmed to play female lead, Salma. Jerome Kurnia to debut Indonesian television, he played Argo. Billy Davidson was cast as William.

== Soundtrack ==
Title	Singer	Lyrics	Label
"Masing-Masing"	Ernie Zakri, Ade Govinda	Ade Govinda, Nabila V.	MyMusic Records, Universal Music Malaysia
"Bukti"	Virgoun	Virgoun	dr. m
"Kisah Abadi"	Sammy Simorangkir	Pika Iskandar	Pro-M
"Episode Bahagia"	Govinda	Ade Govinda	MyMusic Records
"Kamu Adalah"	Ade Govinda, Cakra Khan	Ade Govinda, Ariqa	MyMusic Records

Notes

Main theme song
