= Cinta Dalam Sujudku =

Indonesian drama television series

- Genre: Religion; Drama
- Based on: Cinta dalam Sujudku by Diana Febi
- Screenplay by: Pratiwi Juliani; Jemima
- Directed by: John De Rantau; Angling Sagaran
- Starring: Yasmin Napper; Rangga Azof; Asha Assuncao; Yoshi Sudarso; Hannah Hannon; Elryan Carlen; Restu Sinaga; Maeeva Amin; Tike Priatnakusumah; Palestine Irtiza; Santana Sartana; Krisna Murti Wibowo; Ustadz Solmed; Ayu Inten; Erlin Sarintan
- Theme music composer: Siska Salman
- Opening theme: "Cinta dalam Sujudku" by Siska Salman
- Ending theme: "Cinta dalam Sujudku" by Siska Salman
- Composer: Joseph S. Djafar
- Country of origin: Indonesia
- Original language: Indonesian
- No. of seasons: 1
- No. of episodes: 8

Production
- Executive producers: Anthony Buncio; Sutanto Hartono; Mark Francis
- Producer: Wicky V. Olindo
- Cinematography: Indra Suryadi
- Editor: Kelvin Nugroho
- Camera setup: Multi-camera
- Running time: 50 minutes
- Production company: Screenplay Films

Original release
- Network: Vidio
- Release: 17 July – 28 August 2025

Cinta Dalam Sujudku is an Indonesian television series which aired from 17 July 2025 to 28 August 2025 on Vidio based on the novel of the same title by Diana Febi. Produced by Screenplay Films, it stars Yasmin Napper, Rangga Azof, and Asha Assuncao.

== Plot ==
Zaki is devastated when he learns that Zahra, his first love, has chosen to be engaged to another man. In an effort to let go of the past, Zaki decides to marry Risa. However, their marriage never truly escapes Zahra's shadow.

When Zahra's life begins to decline due to her abandonment, Risa opens the door for Zahra to reappear in their lives. Zaki and Risa's marriage is tested by an unresolved past and difficult choices.

== Cast ==
- Yasmin Napper as Zahra Humaira Fitri
- Rangga Azof as Zaki Mubarak
- Asha Assuncao as Risa Aisyah Nirmalasari
- Yoshi Sudarso as Gus Harris Malik
- Hannah Hannon as Revi
- Elryan Carlen as Andhika
- Restu Sinaga as Mansyur
- Maeeva Amin as Febi
- Tike Priatnakusumah as Lela
- Palestine Irtiza as Ilham
- Santana Sartana as Firmansyah
- Krisna Murti Wibowo as Roy
- Ustadz Solmed as Ustad Bahar
- Ayu Inten as kepala sekolah
- Erlin Sarintan as teman Lela

== Production ==
=== Development ===
Vidio was officially announced a new series titled Cinta dalam Sujudku on 27 June 2025.

=== Casting ===
Rangga Azof was confirmed to play the male lead role as Zaki. Yasmin Napper was signed to play the female lead, Zahra. Yoshi Sudarso was assigned as Gus Haris Malik.
