= Children of Heaven =

Children of Heaven may refer to:

- Children of Heaven (1997 film), an Iranian family drama film
- Children of Heaven (2026 film), an Indonesian family drama film
- AmaZulu: The Children of Heaven, a 2006 British documentary film
