= Mohede =

Mohede is a Sangirese surname. Notable people with the surname include:

- Frans Mohede (born 1976), Indonesian singer, actor, and Muay-thai instructor
- Mike Mohede (1983–2016), Indonesian singer
