= Lingua (indonesian vocal group) =

- Born: 16 March 1996 (age 30)
- Origin: Jakarta, Indonesia
- Years active: 1996 – 2001; 2015 – present
- Labels: Ris Music Wijaya International; Musica Studios; Ariola; Lingua Musik Indonesia
- Members: Frans Mohede; Amara; Arie Widiawan

Lingua is an Indonesian vocal group formed in 1996, consisting of Frans Mohede, Amara, and Arie Widiawan. Throughout its career, Lingua has released four albums and four singles, namely three studio albums and one compilation mini album, as well as released four singles, namely two non-album singles and two singles recycles.

== Career ==
=== Formation ===
The formation began when the members gathered in 1996, playing cessions for fun. It was based on Frans and Amara singing, while Arie had an educational background, from Elfa's Music School was in Bandung music.

Before Arie's entry, actually they already had one permanent member, and even made a demo recording with the formation of two men and one woman to record, after receiving an offer to enter the recording studio, one of the members officially resigned, on the recommendation of Dody Is (Kahitna), Arie officially replaced the previous member who had previously resigned. After the resignation of these members, they finally agreed to make a demo recording.

=== Early years: 1996 - 2001 ===
Lingua released their first album, titled Bila Kuingat which was released in December 1996. Lingua re-released their second album, titled Bintang which was released in December 1998. In 1999, Lingua re-released repackage second album Bintang, entitled Aku which was released in April 1999 After releasing their second album, Lingua decided to vacuum from Indonesian music industry. Due to not renewing their contract with a major record label, they decided to produce the album independently. Because they openly refuse, acknowledging that the development conditions for Indonesian music industry are always changing and erratic, not according to their principles, namely idealist compromise. and acknowledges the development situation in Indonesian music industry when it was affected by financial crisis in Asia, including Indonesia. based on the confession of Amara. He said: "But seeing the development of the music industry now, it's better to go back regularly, the music industry in Indonesia is very different". apart from that, it is almost the same as the statement from Amara according to the confession of Frans Mohede. It says:. "Actually, we want to revive Lingua but how old are we. Let's just leave the young ones, after all, musical works and the way of appreciation are different now." From this statement, it emphasized the reason for Lingua's vacuum from the Indonesian music industry, namely to maintain their idealistic attitude so far which is often considered too idealistic by most of the major record labels in Indonesia because they are considered unwilling to follow the market, thus raising the issue of banning them because of the issue of Frans - Amara's marriage. not approved by Amara's mother, and is often considered disbanded by most Indonesian music lovers since Lingua decided to leave the Indonesian music industry.

=== Early years: 2015 - present ===
Lingua returned to work, this time he collaborated with Coboy under the name Colabo, Collaboration of Lingua and Coboy. this marks them after 14 years of vacuum from Indonesian music industry. a year later, Lingua re-released their third album, entitled Mampu Bertahan which was released on October 20, 2016.

== Musical style and composition ==
For his musical style, Lingua still adheres to patents from the beginning of their career, because Lingua will not go out of the corridor of Lingua's music, both in vocal arrangements and musical arrangements. For vocal arrangements, it does not come out of the characteristics and colors. As for the music arrangement, we continue to explore the existing music space by experimenting with various genres of music without leaving the musical character of Lingua.

For making music, they mostly work with several well-known musicians, even they admit that most of them are not proficient at playing musical instruments, including the creative process in making their music is quite time-consuming because they prioritize quality according to their idealistic principles. In addition, the making of albums and singles they do is done by prioritizing the music market, not being carried away by the flow, as well as making albums and releasing them so that they are different in terms of arrangement, including marketing strategies for the Indonesian music industry according to their principles.

=== Vocals ===
Lingua unites their different vocal characters from Amara, Arie and Frans by building a strong foundation with a bass chorus, Frans is more inclined to his Tenor vocals with a slight twist to the high notes with his falsettos, while Arie's voice is more inclined to His vocal character is Bariton with swerving to high notes, sometimes in the bass voice, while Amara is audio-friendly with his Alto vocal character with his characteristic hoarse vocals sounding heavy with a little strong shout.

Lingua is famous for its very strong vocal harmonies matched with sincere and emotional ballads with their distinctive vocal harmonization division consisting of Frans improvising vocals with a distinctive falsetto in the middle, he also sometimes has a bit of bass, while Arie is more likely to swerve. to high notes, sometimes he improvises his falsetto voice not too high and more often in the bass section, while Amara is more in the chorus, sometimes also in the verse section with heavy vocals, he also improvises vocals with a bit of a distinctive scream.

=== Lyrics and themes ===
Most of their songs are written by known songwriters, and Amara contributes to several songs on every Lingua album released, and most of their songs are about universal love, friendship and togetherness, spirituality and tolerance takes more values of religious and ethnic pluralism in Indonesia.

== Artistry ==
=== Music video ===
Lingua is famous for sticking to their character at the beginning of their debut to be their hallmark. namely, the concept of their video clip, one of which is a special principle. Lingua is never separated from three things that are of particular concern, namely the choice of songs, vocal arrangements, and video clips. According to Arie Widiawan's confession. It says:. "We are always passionately looking for concept video clips." In addition, Lingua has given a lot of great influence on the Indonesian music industry, as well as giving a lot of great influence on the video clips they make. one of them collaborated with several video clip directors. one of them from Rizal Mantovani and Nayato Fio Nuala had worked with them.

The concept of a video clip is not separated from one part by them, one of which is their creative process in making the concept of a video clip they present, namely making the concept of their video clip always different, which has not been done by most Indonesian musicians, generally according to the confession of Frans Mohede. He said: "The concept has always been that Lingua wants something different. What other musicians haven't done yet." For Lingua, video clips have an important role in pouring a song through a visual process. Therefore, Lingua did not want to be careless in making their video clip according to the confession of Frans Mohede. He says: "Making a video clip that is easy to remember. Making a video clip must be like that in order to get awareness from the public."

In addition, one of the sources of inspiration to find their video clip concept inspired by the concept of foreign video clips which tend to be unique and quirky mostly comes from references to their video clips from foreign musicians coming from the music references of each member from Lingua. According to the confession of Frans Mohede. It says: "We also see video clips from abroad. Video clips are still a tool. The video clip is a picture of the singer. We see video clips as a means to introduce Lingua." Because the video clips they make mostly use simple concepts, they tend to be unique and even too quirky with a positive message for the size of most Indonesian video clips in general.

=== Fashion style ===
For their fashion style, the style of clothing Lingua wears is mostly old school, psychedelic, and practical. They see that developments in the fashion world tend to have a unique orientation, and eccentricity is one of the inspirations for their clothes that they have worn so far.

== Public image ==
Lingua is known for its principle of very strong idealism in its work, it can be seen from their attitude that they don't want to be too carried away by the mainstream or current trends in the Indonesian music industry, both in terms of systems and musical trends, according to them, they are considered to be not in accordance with their character openly according to the confession of Frans Mohede. It says: "Because we have a disagreement with one of the music producers. Even though we look gentle, we are actually naughty. We understand what we have to present to our friends. And, we also have to maintain our uniqueness. We don't want to get into domain is our rival. Because of that, there was a mismatch with the producer."

often considered too idealistic, after releasing their second album, they immediately decided not to renew the contract with a major record label with unreasonable reasons, namely the development situation of the Indonesian music industry when it was affected by the financial crisis that hit regions in Asia, including Indonesia as well as refusing to follow the system in the Indonesian music industry, only following trends and being too involved, one of the common practices carried out by most of the major record labels at that time, even musicians accustomed to independent principles and different musical characters belonging to big labels were actually affected, and too privileged by certain musicians, thus causing them the reason behind not renewing their contracts with major record labels. After not renewing his contract with a major record label. They decided to produce their own album independently from creating their own record label to distributing their album independently. One of the very bold steps to leave a major record label when they are one of the groups that have been considered quite large at a major record label to date by adhering to their principles so far, namely idealism compromise, one of their principles so far according to Arie Widiawan's confession. It says: "In general, it's a idealis compromise, maybe it's Lingua's adaptation strategy to face the current music industry." In addition, almost the same statement from Arie Widiawan. However, the statement is slightly different from Frans Mohede. He said:. "So don't be so idealistic. We've also been paying attention to the music that is developing." So that the statement that their reasons behind maintaining their attitude are often considered too idealistic in their work, including opposing the system and trends towards the development of the Indonesian music industry, which are considered not according to their principles so far.

Apart from that, they categorically refused openly, acknowledging that the development conditions for the Indonesian music industry were always changing and uncertain and even too disruptive, so the reason behind not renewing their contract with a major record label. One of their attitudes is considered courageous, but they admit that they still pay attention to trends and systems in the Indonesian music industry today without eliminating their principles so far from Frans Mohede's recognition. He said: "The situation is now changing. We can't force the will of the market." Because their attitude was considered too idealistic, it was rumored that they were banned by several major record labels because the issue of Frans - Amara's marriage was not approved by Amara's mother. It is said that the issue came from the intervention of Amara's mother, and not renewing the contract with a major record label, because the development situation in the Indonesian music industry at that time was affected by the financial crisis that hit the region in Asia, and refusing to follow the system in the Indonesian music industry according to them was considered not in accordance with the principles. they. One reason did not make sense by most of the musicians belonging to other major labels at that time, which has the potential to cause controversy and debate. Because of their attitude that caused them most of the major record labels ban them because of their dislike of their attitude is considered too idealistic and the issue of marriage Frans - Amara. In addition, many think they disbanded. However, this issue was immediately denied by Frans, Amara and Arie on several occasions.

== Members ==
Current members

- Frans Mohede — (1996 – present)
- Amara - (1996 – present)
- Arie Widiawan — (1996 – present)

== Discography ==
=== Studio album ===
- Bila Kuingat (1996)
- Bintang (1998)
- Mampu Bertahan (2016)

=== Singles ===
- Good Times (2015)
- Arti Sebuah Keangkuhan (2017)
- Jangan Kau Henti (2019 version) (2019)
- Bila Kuingat (2019 version) (2019)
- Temani Malamku (2020)
