= Saudade (disambiguation) =

Saudade traditionally is a Portuguese word, describing an emotion

Saudade may also refer to:

== Film ==
- Saudade (TV series), a 2025 Indonesian TV series
- Saudade (film), a 2011 Japanese film

== Music ==
- "Saudade" (Étienne Daho song), a 1994 song by Étienne Daho from his album La Notte, la notte
- Saudade (Masayoshi Takanaka album)
- Saudade (Moacir Santos album), 1974
- "Saudade" (Porno Graffitti song), a 2000 song by Porno Graffitti
- Saudade (Saki Kubota album)
- Saudade (Thievery Corporation album), 2014
- Saudade, a 2013 EP by indie pop singer-songwriter Tei Shi
- "Saudade", a 1994 song by Chris Rea from The Very Best of Chris Rea
- "Saudade", an instrumental by alternative rock band Love and Rockets
- A supergroup band, formed in 2016, consisting of Chino Moreno, Dr. Know, keyboardist John Medeski, bassist Chuck Doom, and drummer Mackie Jayson
- Saudade LP, solo album by rapper producer Mr. J. Medeiros
