= Tangled in a Promise =

- Also known as: Tangled in a Promise
- Genre: Drama; Romantic
- Screenplay by: Donna Rosamayna
- Directed by: Amin Ishaq
- Starring: Arya Saloka; Asha Assuncao; Fendy Chow; Yoriko Angeline; Rizky Hanggono; Kinaryosih; Virnie Ismail; Oding Siregar; Rizky Djanbi; Ibob Tarigan; Dito Darmawan; Pisca Maharani; Hannah Hannon
- Theme music composer: Mahalini, Andmesh Kamaleng
- Opening theme: "Batasi Rasa" by Mahalini
- Ending theme: "Batasi Rasa" by Mahalini
- Composers: Reza; Cutting Point Studio
- Country of origin: Indonesia
- Original language: Indonesian
- No. of seasons: 1
- No. of episodes: 87

Production
- Executive producers: Filriady Kusmara; Moh Kamil Wahyudi
- Producer: Reno Marciano
- Cinematography: Jimmy Sirait
- Editors: Hendriyanto; Darto Rahardi; C-One; Bang-B; Cutting Point Studio
- Camera setup: Multi-camera
- Running time: 75 minutes
- Production company: MNC Pictures

Original release
- Network: RCTI; Netflix
- Release: 6 April 2026 – present

Terikat Janji (lit. 'Tangled in a Promise') is an Indonesian television series produced by MNC Pictures which premiered on 6 April 2026 WIB on RCTI and Netflix. The series stars Arya Saloka, Asha Assuncao, and Fendy Chow.

== Plot ==
Davina, the daughter of a conglomerate, is devastated by betrayal. She boldly asks Sena, a ketoprak (traditional Indonesian food) seller, to be her fake boyfriend to maintain her pride. However, the relationship, which initially began as a charade, slowly opens old wounds that have been hidden.

Sena turns out to be more than just an ordinary man. He carries a past, secrets, and goals that have the potential to shake Davina's family from within.

When it is revealed that Ryan's death is related to Davina's father and her stepmother's devious schemes, everything changes. Love becomes a gamble, and family turns into enemies.

== Cast ==
- Arya Saloka as Sena Airlangga Abraham
- Asha Assuncao as Davina Rosalia Kusuma
- Fendy Chow as Dipa Andhika
- Yoriko Angeline as Jihan Almira Kusuma
- Rizky Hanggono as Novan Kusuma
- Kinaryosih as Mayang Kusuma
- Virnie Ismail as Veronica
- Oding Siregar as Prama
- Rizky Djanbi as Reza
- Ibob Tarigan as Dion
- Baby Assegaf as Tara
- Dito Darmawan as Ryan Dirgantara
- Irsan Adira as Bilal
- Pisca Maharani as Melani
- Hannah Hannon. as Desi Aprilia
- Aurelia Lourdes as Lidya Saraswati

== Production ==
=== Casting ===
Arya Saloka was chosen to play Sena. and this series marks his return to TV after a 3 year hiatus. Asha Assuncao was selected to play Davina.

== Reception ==
=== Rating ===
In the first episode, it ranked eleventh with a TVR 1.8 and audience share 7.6%.
