= Ketika Cinta Memanggilmu =

Indonesian drama television series

- Genre: Melodrama; Romance; Revenge; Thriller
- Screenplay by: Serena Luna
- Story by: Serena Luna
- Directed by: Anurag Vaishnav
- Starring: Natasha Wilona; Rionaldo Stockhorst; Cakrawala Airawan; Antonio Blanco Jr.; Dosma Hazenbosch; Agatha Valerie; Rendi John; Mentari De Marelle; Renald Ramadhan; Dylan Carr; Indra Brasco; Ade Herlina; Helsi Herlinda; Yadi Timo; Sigit Hardadi; Rangga Nattra; Lenny Charlotte; Eca Yasmin; Krisna Mukti; Dicky Wahyudi; Annisa Hasim; Andi Annisa; Carlo Milk; Agus Wibowo
- Theme music composer: Andi Rianto, Titi DJ
- Opening theme: "Sang Dewi" by Novita Dewi
- Ending theme: "Sang Dewi" by Novita Dewi
- Composer: Raihan Zaky
- Country of origin: Indonesia
- Original language: Indonesian
- No. of seasons: 1
- No. of episodes: 209

Production
- Executive producer: David S. Suwarto
- Producer: Sridhar Jetty
- Cinematography: Welly Djuanda; Team Essjay
- Editor: Team Essjay
- Camera setup: Multi-camera
- Running time: 90 minutes
- Production companies: SinemArt; Ess Jay Studios

Original release
- Network: SCTV; Vidio
- Release: 13 January – 14 August 2025

Ketika Cinta Memanggilmu is an Indonesian television series produced by SinemArt and Ess Jay Studios which aired from 13 January 2025 to 14 August 2025 on SCTV and streams digitally on Vidio. It starring Natasha Wilona, Rionaldo Stockhorst, and Cakrawala Airawan.

== Plot ==
Amira Kayana is a simple girl who has lived in hardship since childhood with her father, Kusno Hermansyah.

Despite her challenging life, Amira always has her childhood friend, and future husband, Galang Bagaspati by her side.

Amira hopes to live a happy life with Galang after they move to Jakarta.

However, fate has other plans. Amira's life changes drastically when Kusno, her father, sells her into a secret marriage with Aksara Rahadian.

Aksara is the son of Bastian Rahadian, a figure Galang hates. This marriage marks the beginning of a nightmare for Amira, but also opens up a new journey full of twists and turns.

== Cast ==
=== Main ===
- Natasha Wilona as Amira Kayana
- Rionaldo Stockhorst as Aksara Rahardian
- Cakrawala Airawan as Galang Wicaksana/ Yudha
- Antonio Blanco Jr. as Adam Black Bagaskara

=== Recurring ===
- Dosma Hazenbosch as Talita Rahardian
- Agatha Valerie as Bella Paramita Lesmana
- Rendi Jhon as Jorgy
- Mentari De Marelle as Hilda
- Renald Ramadhan as Reno Rahardian
- Dylan Carr as Zaki Ananta
- Indra Brasco as Bastian Rahardian
- Ade Herlina as Yuni
- Helsi Herlinda as Zora
- Athara Adiwijaya as Alfi Putra Rahardian
- Yadi Timo as Kusno Hermansyah
- Sigit Hardadi as Tommy
- Rangga Nattra as Damar Setiadi
- Lenny Charlotte as Ria
- Poppy Widya as keluarga Galang
- Indi Saputra as keluarga Galang
- Eca Yasmin as Jumi
- Tia Fairuz as Ijah
- Krisna Mukti as Benny Wicaksana
- Rika Fransiska as Laura
- Devi Ginong as Parti
- Dicky Wahyudi as Lian Bagaskara
- Annisa Hasim as Raisa
- Eldania Zahra as Maya
- Andi Annisa as Lana
- Carlo Milk as Iyan
- Jack Arsene as Dirga
- Alesha Al Mahdaly as Nayla
- Elvina Isdiyanti as Susi
- Agus Wibowo as Wira

== Production ==
=== Casting ===
Natasha Wilona was signed in to play Amira. This series marks Wilona's return to television after a 2-year hiatus. Rionaldo Stockhorst were roped in to play Aksara. Cakrawala Airawan joined the cast for playing Galang. Antonio Blanco Jr. was selected to play Adam. Agatha Valerie was chosen to play Bella.
