= The Secret: Suster Ngesot Urban Legend =

- Poster film
- Directed by: Raffi Ahmad; Arie Azis
- Written by: Demas Garin; Talitha Tan
- Produced by: Raffi Ahmad
- Starring: Nagita Slavina; Marshanda; Kanaya Gleadys; Raffi Ahmad; Roy Marten; Tyas Mirasih; Kartika Putri; Wika Salim; Lia Waode; Gisella Anastasia
- Cinematography: Zeta Alfa Maphilindo
- Edited by: Ilham Adinatha
- Music by: Yusuf Patawari; Zoopry Pebrian; Joseph S Djafar
- Production company: RA Pictures
- Distributed by: RA Pictures
- Release date: 26 April 2018 (Indonesia)
- Language: Indonesia

The Secret: Suster Ngesot Urban Legend is a 2018 Indonesian horror film released in 2019. The film was directed by Arie Azis, and stars Nagita Slavina, Marshanda, Kanaya Gleadys, and Raffi Ahmad. The film is a complete and continuing story of the novel of the same name released on February 9, 2018. Utopia's song 'Antara Ada dan Tiada' was chosen as the soundtrack for the film, and was sung by Nagita Slavina and Marshanda.

== Plot ==
Returning from her studies in Melbourne, Australia, Kanaya (Nagita Slavina) is surprised to discover that her father (Roy Marten) married a woman named Sofie (Tyas Mirasih) two months before her return. To her shock, Sofie is the same age as Kanaya. She decides to leave, but soon has an accident that results in her being taken to a haunted hospital for treatment. There, Kanaya begins to be terrorized by Suster Ngesot. As family conflicts arise alongside the terror from Suster Ngesot, Kanaya becomes increasingly depressed.

== Cast ==
- Nagita Slavina as Kanaya, a girl who returns home from abroad to find her father has remarried. This brings on a barrage of problems for Kanaya.
- Raffi Ahmad as Teddy, Kanaya's ex-boyfriend, who still cares about her. After seeing Kanaya in trouble, he tries to help.
- Kanaya Gleadys as Kemala, an indigo child who is considered strange by others but becomes Kanaya's best friend.
- Marshanda as Suster Maryam/Marsha, Kemala's home schooling teacher, and Kanaya's close friend.
- Roy Marten as Ridwan, Kanaya's father.
- Tyas Mirasih as Sofie, Ridwan's young wife, the same age as Kanaya.
- Kartika Putri as Putri, Kemala's yoga-trainer mother.
- Wika Salim as Suster Asih, a beautiful junior nurse at the hospital where Kanaya is treated.
- Lia Waode as Suster Yoyom, a nurse who works at the hospital where Kanaya is treated.
- Merry Sadili as Dudung
- Farida Pasha as Nenek
- Nisya Ahmad as Mama Kanaya
- Mikaela Atqia Rosadi as Kemala Kecil
- Mongol Stres as Mantri Ismet
- TJ as Dokter Bertha
- Caisar Putra Aditya as Satpam
- Dede Sunandar as Paijo
- Nunung as Ibu Paijo
- Gisella Anastasia as Nicole

== Theme Song ==
- Utopia's song 'Antara Ada dan Tiada' sung by Nagita Slavina and Marshanda.
