= Jalinan Terlarang =

Indonesian drama television series

- Genre: Melodrama
- Created by: Wicky V. Olindo
- Written by: Sonakshi Khandelwal; Ario Sangsoko; Keke Mayang
- Directed by: John De Rantau; Angling Sagaran
- Starring: Marshanda; Dimas Anggara; Maria Theodore; Kiesha Alvaro; Rizky Alatas; Ria Probo; Okan Kornelius; Oding Siregar; Ayu Inten
- Composer: Joseph S. Djafar
- Country of origin: Indonesia
- Original language: Indonesian
- No. of seasons: 1
- No. of episodes: 10

Production
- Executive producers: Sutanto Hartono; Mark Francis; Kristho Damar Alam; Anthony Buncio
- Producer: Wicky V. Olindo
- Cinematography: Indra Suryadi
- Editor: Kelvin Nugroho
- Camera setup: Multi-kamera
- Running time: 45 minutes
- Production company: Screenplay Films

Original release
- Network: Vidio
- Release: 2 October – 27 November 2025

Jalinan Terlarang is an Indonesian television series which aired on 2 October 2025 to 27 November 2025 on Vidio. Produced by Screenplay Films, it stars Marshanda, and Dimas Anggara.

== Plot ==
Syafa and Rangga have been married for 11 years. Syafa's life is very difficult, having to be the breadwinner for her family, supporting her mother, her older sister, her family, and her younger brother, Fahri.

Syafa's burdens become even heavier when Fahri impregnates her girlfriend, Gina. To help her sister, Syafa willingly takes Gina into her home until she gives birth. Unfortunately, Syafa's decision brings new problems.

Rangga, initially cold to Gina, slowly softens when she is often asked to help with her pregnancy. Rangga and Gina's closeness eventually leads to a forbidden temptation.

== Cast ==
- Marshanda as Syafa
- Dimas Anggara as Rangga
- Maria Theodore as Gina
- Kiesha Alvaro as Fahri
- Rizky Alatas as Marwan
- Ria Probo as Rani
- Adhitya Alkatiri as Al
- Dini Hanipahm as Merry
- Dessyre as Dina
- Okan Kornelius as Richard
- Zalika Wungguli as Ara
- Amanda Gondowijoyo as Manda
- Oding Siregar as Rudy
- Husnie Ramdan as Juna
- Aura Moore as Raya
- Verina Ardiyanti as Lori / Syafa
- Nikita Rizki as dr. Melati
- Ayu Inten as dr. Ida

== Production ==
=== Development ===
Vidio was officially announced a new series titled Jalinan Terlarang on 20 September 2025.

=== Casting ===
Marshanda was signed to play the female lead, Syafa. Maria Theodore was confirmed to play Gina.

=== Controversy ===
When he finished taking the shooting, Dimas Anggara slapped Kiesha Alvaro so that the video went viral and Anggara apologized for the incident.
