= Bad Guys (Indonesian TV series) =

2025 Indonesian action television series

- Genre: Action; Thriller; Crime
- Based on: Bad Guys
- Written by: Ambaridzki Ramadhantyo
- Directed by: Ferry Pei Irawan; William Chandra
- Starring: Oka Antara; Dwi Sasono; Randy Pangalila; Maudy Effrosina; Omara Esteghlal; Nugie; Verdi Solaiman; Ibnu Jamil; Kenes Andari; Afrian Arisandy; Nayla D. Purnama; Marcelino Lefrandt; Surya Saputra; Justin Adiwinata; Shinta Devi; Amos Putra; Wina Marrino
- Composer: Ofel Obaja
- Country of origin: Indonesia
- Original language: Indonesian
- No. of seasons: 1
- No. of episodes: 10

Production
- Executive producers: Sutanto Hartono; Mark Francis; Shanty Harmayn; Tanya Yuson
- Producers: Sari Mochtan; Muhammad Omar Azis
- Cinematography: Gerry Habir; Donny Arlen
- Editor: Umar Syarif Yahman
- Camera setup: Multi-camera
- Running time: 40 minutes
- Production companies: BASE Entertainment; CJ ENM

Original release
- Network: Vidio
- Release: 21 February – 18 April 2025

Bad Guys is an Indonesian television drama series that aired from 21 February 2025 to 18 April 2025 on Vidio. Produced by BASE Entertainment and CJ ENM, it is an adaptation of the eponymous Korean series. It stars Oka Antara, Dwi Sasono, and Randy Pangalila.

== Synopsis ==
Jaka is a policeman who is the father of Sekar, a daughter. However, Sekar was murdered and Jaka could not accept losing his daughter.

Jaka continues to seek revenge because of the serial murders that killed his daughter.

Feeling desperate with the legal system that has not yet offered justice, Jaka recruits three criminals from prison to help him find the perpetrator.

The investigation they conduct takes them into the drug network and the corrupt justice system.

Jaka's team (the Bad Guys) unknowingly opens a "Pandora's box", revealing secrets that raises a dilemma: who is actually good and who is pretending?

== Cast ==
- Oka Antara as Jaka
- Dwi Sasono as Anton
- Randy Pangalila as Haidar
- Maudy Effrosina as Sekar
- Omara Esteghlal as Elias
- Nugie as Gunawan
- Verdi Solaiman as Ferry
- Ibnu Jamil as Yeremia
- Kenes Andari as Sari Manalu
- Afrian Arisandy as Ito
- Nayla D. Purnama as Siska
- Marcelino Lefrandt as Chandra
- Surya Saputra as Ahmad Aziz
- Patty Sandya as Rahayu
- Justin Adiwinata as Omar
- Faris Alfarazi as Jabrik
- Dicky Andryanto as Nurdin
- Kalina Inawati as Ani
- Shinta Devi as Vanesa
- Pak Sam as Mochtar
- Wina Marrino as Dewi
- Fahmi Agelan as Boris
- Amos Putra as Ipang
- Dadang Juanda as Heru
- Fauzan Dima as Farhan
- Aqila as Kinan
- Ari Latah as Torturer

== Awards and nominations ==
Year	Award	Category	Recipient	Result	Ref(s)
2025	Asian Television Awards	Best Southeast Asian Drama Series	Bad Guys	Won	
