= Marshanda =

- Also known as: Marshanda
- Born: Andriani Marshanda; 10 August 1989 (age 37); Jakarta, Indonesia
- Genres: Pop; R&B; Pop rock Dance-pop; Pop religion
- Occupations: Actress; Singer; Songwriter
- Years active: 1997–present
- Labels: Sony Music Indonesia; Epic Records; Columbia Records
- Spouse: Ben Kasyafani (m. 2011; div. 2014)

Andriani Marshanda, better known as Marshanda, (born 10 August 1989) is an Indonesian actress, singer, songwriter, and mental health advocate of Minangkabau descent.

== Biography ==
Marshanda is the eldest of three children, born to parents Riyanti Sofyan and Irwan Yusuf on 10 August 1989 in Jakarta, Indonesia, under the astrological sign Leo. She has a younger brother, Aldrian (Didi) and a younger sister, Allysa (Lisya). She lived in Semarang, Central Java when she was three years old, on the street adjacent to the campus of Pleburan V Undip. She remained there for two years.

== Personal life ==
Chacha (or Marshanda) was in a relationship with actor Baim Wong, but they eventually broke up. Chacha then began a relationship with a television host and MTV Indonesia VJ, Ben Kasyafani. After dating for three years, Chacha and Kasyafani got married on 2 April 2011. Their wedding was held in the Bidakara Hotel in Pancoran, Jakarta. The event was arranged in the customs of Minangkabau, which is Chacha's ethnic background.

On 22 January 2013, Chacha gave birth to a daughter, Sienna Ameerah Kasyafani. The couple divorced in 2014. Both parents sought custody of their daughter, but in the first stage of the court decision, Kasyafani was granted custody.

On 13 June 2015, Marshanda graduated from Universitas Pelita Harapan.

Marshanda has been diagnosed with bipolar II disorder and has become an advocate of bipolar disorder awareness. Since 2019, she has been speaking about bipolar disorder awareness at various seminars and podcasts. In 2022, she launched the #SeeingTheUnseen campaign in partnership with TikTok Indonesia, introducing a batik design inspired by the brain waves of people with bipolar disorder.

== Discography ==
=== Studio album ===
- Bidadari (Angel) (2000)
- Marshanda (2005)
- Taubat (Reptile) (2014)

=== Compilation album ===
- Allah Yang Kucintai (2002)
- Best of Female Idol (2004)
- Broken Heart (2004)
- Kisah Kasih di Sekolah (The Love Story in School) (2004)
- Now and Forever (2004)
- Dua Belas Lagu Islami Terbaik (Twelve Best Islamic Songs) (2004)

=== Single ===
Year	Title	Album	Label
2000	"Bidadari"	Bidadari	Avante
2004	"Kisah Sedih di Hari Minggu (The Sad Story in Sunday)"	Marshanda	Sony Music Indonesia, Epic Records, Columbia Records
2004	"Sebuah Pengakuan (A Confession)"	Dua Belas Lagu Islami Terbaik (Twelve Best Islamic Songs)	Sony Music Indonesia, Epic Records, Columbia Records
2005	"Kita Untuk Mereka (Us for Them)"	Marshanda	Sony Music Indonesia, Epic Records, Columbia Records
2005	"Pasangan Yang Tepat (The Great Matches)"	Marshanda	Sony Music Indonesia, Epic Records, Columbia Records
2005	"Manis Dan Sayang (Sweet and Love)"	Marshanda	Sony Music Indonesia, Epic Records, Columbia Records
2005	"Astaghfirullah (Oh My God)"	Dua Belas Lagu Islami Terbaik Vol. 2 (Twelve Best Islamic Songs Vol. 2)	Sony Music Indonesia, Epic Records, Columbia Records
2007	"Dengan Menyebut Nama Allah (In the name of Allah)"	Dua Belas Lagu Islami Terbaik Vol. 3 (Twelve Best Islamic Songs Vol. 3)	Sony Music Indonesia, Epic Records, Columbia Records
2008	"Ketulusan Hati (Sincerity Love)"	Taubat (Reptile)	Sony Music Indonesia, Epic Records, Columbia Records
2011	"Taubat"	Taubat (Reptile)	Sony Music Indonesia, Epic Records, Columbia Records
2011	"Cinta Yang Kembali (The Love Who Came Back)"	Non-album single	Sony Music Indonesia, Epic Records, Columbia Records
2012	"Beri Aku Cinta (Give Me Love)"	Non-album single	Sony Music Indonesia, Epic Records, Columbia Records
2014	"Kamu (You)"	Non-album single	Sony Music Indonesia, Epic Records, Columbia Records

== Filmography ==
=== Film ===
Year	Title	Role	Notes
2004	Petualangan 100 Jam (The Adventure of 100 Hours)	Marsya	Lead role
2009	Kalau Cinta Jangan Cengeng (Because Love Don't Whine)	Yani	Lead role
2016	3 Pilihan Hidup		
2018	The Secret: Suster Ngesot Urban Legend	Sister Maryam/Marsha	Lead role
2022	Gendut Siapa Takut	Moza	Lead Role

=== Television ===
Year	Title	Role	Notes	Network
1997	Jinny Oh Jinny	Little Jinny	Supporting role	RCTI
2000–2002	Bidadari (Angel)	Lala Indriani	Lead role	RCTI
2002–2003	Bidadari 2 (Angel 2)	Lala Indriani	Lead role	RCTI
2003–2004	Kisah Kasih di Sekolah (The Love Story in School)	Kasih	Lead role	SCTV
2003	Keluargaku Mata Hatiku (My Heart is My Family's Eyes)	Herself	Variety show	Trans TV
2004–2005	Kisah Sedih di Hari Minggu (The Sad Story in Sunday)	Imel	Lead role	RCTI
2004	Adam & Hawa (Adam and Hawa)	Hawa	Lead role	SCTV
2005	Manis dan Sayang (Sweet and Love)	Lisa	Lead role	SCTV
2005	Hikmah 2 (Wisdom 2)	Komala	Supporting role	RCTI
2005–2006	Anak Cucu Adam (Grandchild Adam)	Alexa	Lead role	RCTI
2006	Benci Bilang Cinta (Love by Saying Hate)	Winda	Lead role	SCTV
2006–2007	Putri Yang Terbuang (The Wasted Daughter)	Putri	Lead role	RCTI
2007	Maha Cinta			RCTI
2007	Soleha	Soleha/Arini	Lead role	RCTI
2008	Aqso dan Madina (Aqso and Madina)	Madina Helm BMC	Lead role	RCTI
2008	Hingga Akhir Waktu (Until the end of Time)	Kania	Lead role	RCTI
2010	Sejuta Cinta Marshanda (The Million Loves of Marshanda)	Marshanda/Chaca	Lead role	RCTI
2011	Dari Sujud ke Sujud (From Prostration to Prostration)	Shofia	Lead role	RCTI
2012	Karunia	Nia	Lead role	RCTI
2018	Orang Ketiga	Yuni/Caca/Yurisa	Lead role	SCTV
2023	Induk Gajah	Iragita	Series	
2024	Induk Gajah 2	Iragita	Series	
2024	Jangan Salahkan Aku Selingkuh	Anna Sumadibrata	Series (Dikreditkan sebagai Andriani Marshanda)	WeTV
2025	Jalinan Terlarang	Syafa	Series	Vidio
2025—2026	Melindungimu Selamanya	Nadia Prayogo	Series	WeTV
