= Asmara Gen Z =

2024 Indonesian television series

- Genre: Teen drama; Romantic comedy; Slice of life
- Screenplay by: Vemmy Sagita; Feri Gumpa; Angga Haryono; Azarina Kumila
- Story by: Vemmy Sagita; Feri Gumpa; Angga Haryono
- Directed by: Vemmy Sagita
- Starring: Fattah Syach; Nicole Rossi; Arya Mohan; Aqeela Aza Calista; Harry Vaughan
- Theme music composer: Vemmy Sagita
- Opening theme: "Batas Cinta" by Nicole Rossi, Flavio Zaviera, Aqeela Calista, Audy Maulidyna
- Ending theme: "Batas Cinta" by Nicole Rossi, Flavio Zaviera, Aqeela Calista, Audy Maulidyna
- Composer: Wiwiex Soedarno
- Country of origin: Indonesia
- Original language: Indonesian
- No. of seasons: 1
- No. of episodes: 667

Production
- Executive producer: David S. Suwarto
- Producer: Vemmy Sagita
- Cinematography: Deni Irawan
- Editors: Fangky Yushatta; Budi Luhur; Dwi Indra Setiawan; Deni Surajab; Alex Fernandes; Shigyt Rustam; Eko Hp.; Faisal Yunus; Agus Nur Salmaa; Tan Tan
- Camera setup: Multi-camera
- Running time: ±90 minutes
- Production company: SinemArt

Original release
- Network: SCTV
- Release: 9 December 2024 – 13 September 2026

Asmara Gen Z is an Indonesian television series that premiered on 9 December 2024 to 13 September 2026 at 16.45 WIB on SCTV. This series is directed by Vemmy Sagita and stars Fattah Syach, Aqeela Aza Nicole Rossi, and Arya Mohan.

== Synopsis ==
Fattah, a teenager who often gets into trouble. After experiencing various problems, his stepfather decides to send Fattah to a famous boarding school that is believed to be able to change the behavior of young children. Initially Fattah refused, but as time went by he finally accepted the decision. At the hostel, Fattah meets Zara, a careless girl who often drags him into various new situations. The conflict becomes more complicated when his girlfriend, Aqeela, decides to move into the same dormitory.

Aqeela's presence adds tension to their relationship and creates a dynamic full of drama.

== Cast ==
- Fattah Syach as Fattah Fernandez
- Nicole Rossi as Zara Nicole Rossi/Rose Seraphina Alveric (Note: Zara's real name.)
- Arya Mohan as Arya Mohan Alveric
- Aqeela Aza Calista as Aqeela Calista
- Harry Vaughan as Harry Vaughan
- Raisa Marie as Raisa Marie Teriaz
- Luz Victoria as Luz Victoria
- Jolina as Jolina
- Donny Michael as Jordan Fernandez
- Attar Syach as Leon Suhadi
- Ananda Faturrahman as Amanda Salim
- Sinta Della as Diah Utami/Zendiahra Aurelin "Alveric" (Diah) (Note: Diah's real name.)
- Flavio Zaviera as Flavio
- Vania Priscilla as Vania
- Cantika Putri Kirana as Cantika Pauline
- William Roberts as William
- Yoona Gimenez as Yoona
- Electra Leslie as Electra Adinata
- Montserrat Gizelle as Gizelle
- Najwa Shakira as Shakira
- Jeff Smith as Kenneth Sterling
- Devon Lucca as Devon Lucca Cassarius
- Fathir Muchtar as Danuel Alveric
- Jefan Nathanio as Jefan Nathanio
- Yudetra Atalajinan as Yudetra
- Andro Trinanda as Andro
- Gema Vyandra as Gema
- Enno T. B. as Rita
- Ozzol Ramdan as Hari Kamis Pasarabu
- Dian Sidik as Budi
- Ramzi Al-Muzaki as Rama
- Matthew Kenevan as Matthew Cassarius
- Adam Jordan as Dani Teriaz
- Widika Sidmore as Cassandra Alveric
- Audy Maulidyna as Lidya Calista
- Endhita as Endhita
- Tenny Aininisa as Helena Vaughan
- Kaemita Boediono as Reanita Sherine Cassarius (Anita)
- Catalina Alcorse as Catalina Teriaz
- Jessica Taroreh as Yuka Katana
- Jason Tarlim Barnett as Gunawan
- Siffa Aditya as Adit
- Noel Londok as Noel Alexander
- Diva Nurs as Diva
- Dava Nurs as Dava
- Alejandro Mariano as Alejandro Katana
- Kayla Schaefer as Hana Karenina
- Sydney Azkassya as Mika
- Marsha Risdasari as Marsha Rininta
- Susan Rosi as Mayang Chandrawinata
- Valery Verhey as Blade/Haruna Vaughan
- Michael Russell as Axel Lucian Cassarius
- dr. Cindy May Mc Guire as Bianca Teriaz
- Dominique Sanda as Dominique Cassarius
- Aline Fauziah as Alin
- Eva Anindita as Valerian Cassarius
- Giovanni L. Tobing as Ares Alveric
- S. Tawana Sheldrick as Angelica
- Reea J. C. Donnelly as Rina
- Sandrinna Michelle as Sandrinna Fernandez (Sandy)
- Delano Daniel as Lano
- Haydar Asegaf as Haydar
- Ciara Nadine Brosnan as Kiara Brosnan
- Ali Fikry as Ali
- Ena Pasaribu as Sari
- Difki Khalif as Difki Khalif (self)
- Aruma Khadijah as Aruma (uncredited)
- Gunawan Sudrajat as Rusdi (uncredited)
- Shendy Karunia as Mario (uncredited)
- Egidius Edit as Oggy (uncredited)
- Alfariz as Beno (uncredited)
- Janik Firdaus as Intan Permata (uncredited)
- Aalik as Gilang (uncredited)
- Sasha Alexa as Sasha (uncredited)
- Ine Dewi as Alma (uncredited)
- Gerald Yo as Rio (uncredited)
- Khanz Braga as Firan Chandrawinata (uncredited)
- Fenny Wijaya as Afsari (uncredited)
- Mervinta Tiara as Gina (uncredited)
- Alfarizi as Findo (uncredited)
- Seunghan as Seunghan (self) (uncredited)
- Cut Tari as Karina (uncredited)
- Desi Susanti as Ratna (uncredited)
- Ilyas Bachtiar as Alex (uncredited)
- Firman Maliksyah as Tono (uncredited)
- Eddi Santoso as Albert (uncredited)
- Jerry Likumahuwa as James Estevan (uncredited)
- Sylvia Menul as Jolina's Mother (uncredited)
- Indi Saputra as Harun (uncredited)

== Online distribution ==
The series is also distributed on vidio.com a few hours after the broadcast.
