= Amara (singer) =

Indonesian singer, actress and model

- Tuwuh Adijatitesih Amaranggana
- Born: Tuwuhadijatitesih Amaranggana; 8 July 1975 (age 51); Jakarta, Indonesia
- Other name: Amara Mohede/Mara/Amara Lingua
- Citizenship: Indonesian
- Occupations: Singer; songwriter; music video producer; actress; model; trainer
- Years active: 1989–present
- Spouse: Frans Mohede (m. 1999)
- Parent: Itje Komara (mother)
- Musical career
- Genres: Jazz; R&B; Funk; Soul; Electronica; Folk
- Instrument: Voice
- Labels: Ris Music Wijaya International; Musica Studios; Ariola; Lingua Musik Indonesia
- Member of: Lingua

Tuwuh Adijatitesih Amaranggana (born 8 July 1975), better known by her stage name Amara or Mara is an Indonesian singer, actress, and model.

== Career ==
Amara was born in Jakarta, on 8 July 1975. She was a teenager in 1989, when she started her career as a model for the Indonesian fashion magazine Covergirl. he had plunged into an advertisement model in several advertisements and video clip models for several musicians. Her mother, Itje Komar, works as a producer for a recording studio called "Bintang Gemilang Jaya Sakti" in Jakarta.

In 1996 she founded with Arie Widiawan, and her future husband Frans Mohede, the vocal trio, Lingua. An Indonesian musical group of country pop. Despite the great success that their group has obtained in Indonesia, the group ends in oblivion in the early 2000s. It has been said repeatedly that their decline was cause as a result of the Asian financial crisis.

She has since followed a career as an actress, having received many proposals for roles in soap operas and TV movies. She obtained her first main role in the TV series Mahligai Diatas Pasir ( Above the Sand Castle ) with actor Adjie Massaid, or it embodied a newly installed girl Jakarta and attempts to improve his life after becoming pregnant following a rape. She is a close friend of the actress Michelle Ziudith, they already play together in the soap opera Sajadah Cinta Maryam ( Sajadah Love Maryam ) and in Love in Paris in which she played the role of her own mother.

Under the influence of her husband, Frans Mohede, which is martial arts expert, Amara became a practitioner Muay Thai since 2002. Together, they have already, opened training centers Muay Thai to Jakarta and Bali, to help spread the sport in Indonesia.

== Personal life ==
After living more than eight years together, Amara married the artist Frans Mohede in Hong Kong on 2 December 1999. As Indonesian law prohibits interfaith marriage since 1974, this union was to save foreign civil status to be legally recognized.

Marriage has received parental disapproval of Amara who refuse to attend due to the difference in religion. Amara, is a Sunni Muslim and Mohede, is a Protestant Christian. Despite their differences they remain popular for being a couple, very tolerant and very respectful, Mohede and Amara are known to support each other, in their religious rites and practices.

Their controversial marriage then produced three children: Mahija Nathaniel Sambarana Aryantawira (born on 8 June 2004), Janitra Nathaniel Sambawikrama (born on 8 September 2006) and Rajaswa Nathaniel (born on 17 October 2008).

== Filmography ==
=== Film ===
- Misi: 1511 (Mission: 1511; 2006)
- Tiger Boy (2015)
- ILY from 38.000 Ft (2016)

=== Film television ===
- Orde Cinta (Order of Love; 2001)
- Wajah Kita (Our Face; 2005)
- Hatiku Menangis Melihat Anakku Benci Aku (My heart wept to see my son hates me; 2015)

=== Soap operas ===
- Rembulan Kece
- Cinta Tak Pernah Salah
- Menjemput Impian
- Ketika Cinta Berbunga
- Biarkan Hati Bicara
- Mahligai Diatas Pasir
- Bukan Impian Semusim
- 8 Tahun Kemudian
- Misteri Bali
- Cintakuh di Rumah Susun
- Rembulan & Matahari
- Bawa Aku Terbang
- Bukan Cinta Semusim
- Hidayah
- Suci
- Martabat
- Wajah
- Hafizah
- Cinta Melody
- Cintaku Melati
- Tutur Tinular
- Istri Istri Suamiku
- Putih Abu-Abu
- Love in Paris
- Detak Cinta
- Yang Muda Juga Mencinta
- Operation Wedding Series
- Sajadah Cinta Maryam
- Cinta Di Langit Taj Mahal
- Halilintar

== Discography ==
=== With Lingua ===
==== Studio album ====
- Bila Kuingat (1996)
- Bintang (1998)
- Mampu Bertahan (2016)

==== Singles ====
- Good Times (2015)
- Arti Sebuah Keangkuhan (2017)
- Jangan Kau Henti (2019 version) (2019)
- Bila Kuingat (2019 version) (2019)
- Temani Malamku (2020)

== Advertisements ==
- Sunsilk Premium Scalp Care
- Sunsilk Jeruk Nipis
- Sunsilk Premium Hot Oil
- Packaging Sunsilk
- Promag
- SilverQueen
- Minuman Sari Asem
- Ligna Furniture
- Bisolvon extra
