= Zona Merah =

Action thriller television series

- Genre: Action thriller
- Created by: Sidharta Tata; Fajar Martha Santosa
- Starring: Aghniny Haque; Andri Mashadi; Lukman Sardi; Devano Danendra; Maria Theodore; Ruth Marini; Haru Sandra; Dian Sidik; Ratna Riantiarno
- Country of origin: Indonesia
- Original language: Indonesian
- No. of seasons: 1
- No. of episodes: 8

Original release
- Network: Vidio
- Release: 8 November – 20 December 2024

Zona Merah is an Indonesian action thriller television series created by Sidharta Tata and Fajar Martha Santosa. It starred Aghniny Haque, Andri Mashadi, Lukman Sardi, Devano Danendra, Maria Theodore, Ruth Marini, Haru Sandra, Dian Sidik, and Ratna Riantiarno.

== Plot ==
The series tells the story of the city of Rimbalaya, which has forests and a timber factory driving the economy. City leader Zaenal is known to be kind. He created a rehab center for people with mental illnesses, the elderly, and the homeless. Another character is Maya, who works in a timber factory. She tries to find her younger sibling who suddenly disappeared. Conditions are getting more difficult because the factory does not pay the workers in full. Then multiple corpses are discovered, one of which is Adi's friend, Maya's younger sibling.

Maya is increasingly worried. Risang appears, as a journalist looking for news about Zaenal's bad deeds. This investigation leads him to Zaenal's rehabilitation center, where Adi is found in a suspicious condition.

Risang begins to feel that something bigger and darker is behind the rehabilitation facility. Zombies start appearing.

Ella, a girl from Jakarta, is accidentally caught up in a tragic event while visiting Rimbalaya to meet her grandmother. Fate brings Ella together with Maya, Risang, and Adi amidst various horrific incidents.

Slowly, they are dragged into a dirty political conflict involving power and dark secrets. With the situation getting more critical, the threat of increasingly brutal undead continues to haunt them.

They must race against time to save themselves and their loved ones. They try to escape from the city before it turns into a red zone.

== Cast ==
- Aghniny Haque as Maya
- Andri Mashadi as Risang
- Devano Danendra as Adi
- Maria Theodore as Ella
- Lukman Sardi as Zaenal Effendi
- Haru Sandra Hanindra as Dandy
- Dian Sidik as Seno
- Ruth Marini as Dyah Ayu Maharani
- Ratna Riantiarno as Nelly
- Mariana Resli as Acha
- Aksara Dena as Ipung
- Petrus Billy Popok as Husein
- Alex Suhendra as Purwo
- Godfred Orindeod as Yosep
- M. N. Qomaruddin as Budi
- Nasarius Ardhani Sudaryono as Nurhadi
- Hamdy Salad as Soetoro
- Landung Simatupang as ilmuwan
- Nunung Deni Puspitasari as Rara
- Muhammad Asyrof Al-Ghifari as townspeople

== Production ==
Zona Merah was created by Sidharta Tata and Fajar Martha Santosa, the creator of the popular Pertaruhan The Series, for Screenplay Films. It stars Aghniny Haque, Andri Mashadi, Lukman Sardi, Devano Danendra, Maria Theodore, Ruth Marini, Haru Sandra, Dian Sidik, and Ratna Riantiarno.

Santosa said the series stemmed from the viral case involving the Langkat Regent. "The idea actually came about because we often saw news reports at the time, if I'm not mistaken, about the Langkat Regent locking people up," Santosa said. Although the case is long overdue, Santosa and Tata, along with their fellow Penakawan members who put together the story, admitted they remain inspired and brave enough to bring it to the Zona Merah. "The story is over, but our imagination continues. We're developing the story to take it even further, bringing it to a zombie theme," they said in a press release provided to the media. The story was carefully developed from the end of 2023, in collaboration with Penakawan, a creative house from Yogyakarta, to create Zona Merah. Tata and Fajar stated that they wanted to present a zombie series that was inseparable from local elements. "We at Penakawan really like incorporating things with a local context. What would our society be like if we encountered the living dead?" they said. Not only does Zona Merah change the name "Zombie" to "Living Corpse," but it also explores Indonesian mythology, which features a reddish flower with a pungent, putrid odor. Some believe this flower can cause all sorts of problems, while others believe it can be a potent cure for all ailments. The flower, called "Cawan Hantu," will be the beginning of major problems in Zona Merah, giving rise to terrifying living corpses that terrorize the residents.

Santosa explained the challenges they faced during the ongoing series production process. "There were so many challenges. If we think about it, every day we even worked on at least that scene with 100 extras. 100 extras who would either be corpses, or civilians, or the two of them chasing each other. But at least every day there was one scene that big," said Santosa. "Then there were other challenges regarding the weather and other challenges regarding the makeup that had to be fixed when there was a scene that didn't go well and we had to retake it. Not to mention the distance of the location, for example the distance from the monitor to the set, then the location of the friends who were running after each other was so vast and had to be redone. Just imagine that 4000 people walking again and starting from the beginning. Yes, that's the challenge," he continued.

Tata revealed that every character has their own complexity, but for Ella's character, he had quite a hard time developing the character. "If we talk about Ella's character, she is a character that is very difficult to predict. Later you will know that she operates as a celebrity, but when something big happens in her life, it's as if she opens up and in an instant will become a completely different person. We developed her character at that time a bit complex. I mean it was quite complicated how we created that character because she is a character that will appear continuously, but she always has something that sometimes explodes, sometimes she has to keep it because the traumas that appear in her life so it has to be moved in a very specific way," explained Tata. However, he also feels quite fortunate to have actors who are able to bring their respective characters well. "Luckily, as I said earlier, we have Aghniny Haque, we have Maria Theodore, we have Devano Narendra, and Lukman Sardi, so how they interpret their respective characters amazes us all," he continued.

Zona Merah carries a story with a mix of horror, thriller, action, drama, and black comedy. Tata explained that this series will be a complete package that is not only based on mystical elements. "If we talk about this series, this is something that we can play with many things by combining action, thriller, horror, and even black comedy. This means that when you watch this series, it will be a complete package," said Tata. Santosa also explained that this series will not only tell scary things and be filled with jumpscares, but there is a lot of drama that can be taken from the stories of each character. "We have other stories, we have a story about Maya who is looking for her sister, a story about Risang who is looking for news, a story about Adi who is searching for his identity, a story about Maria Theodore who is struggling with her own life. Well, all of that, gathered together in a city called Rimbalaya whose center is in Central Java whose population is local," Santosa added.

== Release ==
Zona Merah was released on 8 November 2024. It was released in 8 episodes on Vidio streaming platform. The series was one of the four Indonesian thriller series that has the highest rating in 2024.
