= Sejuta Cinta Marshanda =

Indonesian drama television series

- Created by: Leo Sutanto
- Written by: Rafka Ahmad; Dewi Sita
- Directed by: Lono Abdul Ahmad
- Starring: Marshanda; Baim Wong; Ashraf Sinclair; Ben Kasyafani; Alice Norin; Tsania Marwa; Meriam Bellina; Ibnu Jamil; Putri Patricia; Riza Shahab; Lulu Kurnia; Vicky Burky; Fadly; Rommy Sulastyo; Annie Anwar; Leily Sagita; Magdalena Wilda Hamid
- Theme music composer: ST 12
- Opening theme: Sejuta Cinta, Marshanda
- Ending theme: Sejuta Cinta, Marshanda
- Composer: ST 12
- Country of origin: Indonesia
- Original language: Indonesian
- No. of episodes: 61

Production
- Producer: Leo Sutanto
- Production location: Jakarta
- Running time: 90 minutes
- Production company: SinemArt

Original release
- Network: RCTI; TV3
- Release: May 31 – August 2, 2010

Sejuta Cinta Marshanda is a television drama that aired on RCTI and TV3 in Malaysia. Actors include Marshanda, Baim Wong, Ashraf Sinclair, Ben Kasyafani, Tsania Marwa, Ibnu Jamil, Putri Patricia, Wilda Hamid, Meriam Bellina, Annie Anwar, and Vicky Burky.

== Cast ==
- Marshanda as Marshanda/Caca
- Baim Wong as Delvin
- Ashraf Sinclair as Aben
- Alice Norin as Merry
- Ben Kasyafani as Ben
- Tsania Marwa as Marshella/Sheila
- Ibnu Jamil as Romy
- Putri Patricia as Vivi
- Wilda Hamid as Vika
- Meriam Bellina as Anita
- Vicky Burky as Farah
- Lulu Kurnia as Asri
- Annie Anwar as Diana
- Rommy Sulastyo as Ardi
- Leily Sagita as Neni
- Riza Shahab as Akbar
- Magdalena as Della
- Alex Bintaro as Rudi

== Characters and relatives ==
Character	Relatives
Marshanda/Caca	Delvin's lover; is often misunderstood by Abel; Asri's adopted child Romi's brother Ben and Merry's best friend Sheila's twin brother Daughter of Lukman and Anita (formerly called Emily)
Delvin	Chaca's lover Son of Farah and Ardi; Abel's brother Sella's fiancée
Abel	Son of Ardi and Diana; Delvin's brother Always fighting with Chaca
Marshella/Sheila	Chaca's twin brother Daughter of Anita and Lukman; Delvin's fiancée
Ben	Chaca's best friend
Romi	Chaca's brother Asri's adopted child Vivi's husband
Vivi	Romi's wife Chaca's brother-in-law Asri's daughter-in-law
Asri	Romi and Chaca's adoptive mother Vivi's in-law Lukman's sister Anita's sister-in-law Farah, Diana, and Ardi's best friend
Farah	Delvin's mother Ardi's wife Asri and Diana's best friend
Diana	Abel's mother Ardi's wife Farah and Asri's best friend Neni's daughter
Ardi	Abel and Delvin's father Diana and Farah's husband
Neni	Diana's mother Ardi's in-law Abel's grandmother
Anita	Marshanda and Marshella's mother Asri's brother-in-law Lukman's ex-wife
Lukman	Marshanda and Marshella's father Anita's ex-husband Asri's brother Diana's attorney

== Publishers ==
- Theme Song: Sejuta Cinta Marshanda
- Singer: Marshanda
- Songwriter: Charly van Houten (ST 12's vocalist)
- Story/script: Rafka Ahmad
- Director: Lono Abdul Hamid
- Supervision: Maruli Ara
- Assistant Publisher: Heru Hendriyarto
- Publisher: Leo Sutanto
- Company: Sinemart
- TV channel: RCTI, TV3 (Malaysian)
