= Vicky Burky =

Indonesian actress

- Born: Victorine Cherryline Soedarjono Burki; June 17, 1964 (age 61); Bandung, West Java, Indonesia
- Occupations: Actress; aerobic instructor
- Years active: 1988–present

Vicky Burky (born Victorine Cherryline Soedarjono Burki; June 17, 1964) is an Indonesian former soap opera actress and aerobic instructor of Dutch-Sundanese descent. She has gained to popularity for her antagonist role in almost all soap opera.

== Career ==
She has appeared in the soap operas Janji Hati (Promises of the Hearts), Kesucian Prasasti (Sanctity Prasasti), Takdir (Destiny), Anakku Bukan Anakku (My Children is Not My Children, Kehormatan (Honor), Bidadari 2 (Angel 2), Bidadari 3 (Angel 3), Hidayah, Dongeng (Fairy Tale), Hikayah, Dewi (Goddess), Anissa, Seindah Senyum Winona (The Beautiful Smile of Winona) and Sejuta Cinta Marshanda (The Million Loves of Marshanda). She usually plays villainous, wicked, murderous, malicious, sadistic, vicious, and evil characters. She has also appeared in theater productions such as Boenga Roos dari Tjikembang (Boenga Roos of Tjikembang), The Vagina Monologues, and Madame Dasima.

== Personal life ==
She has stated a preference for living together rather than marrying, as she does not feel that marriage guarantees happiness and togetherness.

== Filmography ==
=== Film ===
Year	Title	Role	Notes
2004	Tina Toon dan Lenong Bocah	Mom	Debut film
2008	Cinta Setaman	Guides Gymnastic	Cameo appearance

=== Television ===
Year	Title	Role	Notes	Network
1997	Janjiku	Sisca	Debut soap opera role	
1998	Takdir		Supporting role	Indosiar
1999	Janji Hati	Rana Maringka	Supporting role	SCTV
1999–2000	Kesucian Prasasti	Endang	Supporting role	Indosiar
2000–2004	Kehormatan		Supporting role	Indosiar
2002–2005	Bidadari	Della Anjarsari	Supporting role; 2 seasons	RCTI
2005	Tuhan Ada Dimana-mana	Sonya	Supporting role	RCTI
2005	Ku Bersimpuh Pada-Mu		Episode: "Pembantu Jadi Besan Konglomerat"	Astro Aruna
2005–2006	Anakku Bukan Anakku	Black angel	Supporting role	RCTI
2005	Hidayah	Nyi Mariati	Episode: "Tukang Teluh Mati Dengan Punggung Berlubang"	Trans TV
2005	Hantu Jatuh Cinta	Selvi	Supporting role	Indosiar
2007	Dongeng	Various role	2 episodes ("Kuda Terbang" and "Gadis Buruk Rupa & Penyihir")	Trans TV
2007	Hikayah			Trans TV
2008	Anissa	Mirna	Supporting role	SCTV
2009	Dewi	Indi	Supporting role	RCTI
2010–2011	Seindah Senyum Winona	Fressa	Supporting role	RCTI
2010	Sejuta Cinta Marshanda	Farah	Supporting role	RCTI
2011	Kasih Dan Cinta	Renita	Supporting role	RCTI
2013	Oh Ternyata	Various role		Trans TV
2014	Bintang di Langit		Supporting role	RCTI
2015	Cinta Dilangit Taj Mahal	Hilda	Supporting role	ANTV

== Theater ==
- Boenga Ross dari Tjikembang (Boenga Ross of Tjikembang)
- Vagina Monologues, directed by Ria Irawan
- Madame Dasima
