= Terbelenggu Rindu =

- Genre: Melodrama; Family; Romance
- Screenplay by: Chelvia Chaidir; MNC Pictures; Donna Rosamayna
- Directed by: Kiki Z. K. R.; Gita Asmara
- Starring: Glenca Chysara; Lucky Perdana; Voke Victoria; Ben Joshua; Angel Karamoy; Oka Antara; Masayu Anastasia; Christ Laurent; Lydia Kandou; Frans Mohede; Rachquel Nesia; Claudia Andhara; Emma Warokka; Pierre Gruno; Anastasja Rina; Tabah Penemuan Siregar; Faradina Tika; Jameelah Saleem; Xavier Nainggolan
- Theme music composer: Tintin, Clara Riva, Anggis Devaki
- Opening theme: "Kisah Tanpa Dirimu" by Anggis Devaki
- Ending theme: "Kisah Tanpa Dirimu" by Anggis Devaki
- Composer: Joseph S. Djafar
- Country of origin: Indonesia
- Original language: Indonesian
- No. of seasons: 1
- No. of episodes: 475

Production
- Executive producers: Filriady Kusmara; Rista Ferina; M. Abul Laits
- Producers: Hesti Yudiarti; Muhammad Ramdani; Andes Herjadi; Andre Forester
- Cinematography: Kokoq Priatmoko
- Editors: Anggang W.; Ujang Sunarya; Onetake Cinema
- Camera setup: Multi-camera
- Running time: 75 minutes
- Production company: MNC Pictures

Original release
- Network: RCTI
- Release: 10 October 2024 – 21 January 2026

Terbelenggu Rindu is an Indonesian television series that aired on 10 October 2024 to 21 January 2026 on RCTI. Produced by MNC Pictures and starring Glenca Chysara, Lucky Perdana, and Voke Victoria.

== Plot ==
Amira Syafira Daneswara is a beautiful and gentle woman with a positive outlook on life. Initially, her life was normal and happy with her husband and daughter.

However, fate had other plans. Amira's happiness was shattered by an accident that claimed the lives of her husband and baby. This tragic event turned out to be no accident but rather the work of Vernie Calista, her husband's business partner and lover.

Not only did Amira lose her loved ones, but she also suffered severe trauma that led to mental illness. Despite this, a belief grew within her: that her child was still alive. A deep longing drove Amira to recover.

A fateful encounter brought her together with Biru Adriansyah Hadikusuma. From that moment, Amira slowly reconnected with her daughter, who is now being cared for by Vernie and Noah Ananta Hadikusuma. This story is filled with intrigue, betrayal, and hope: can Amira reclaim her child and find happiness with Biru?

== Cast ==
=== Main ===
- Glenca Chysara as Amira Syafira Daneswara
- Lucky Perdana as Biru Adriansyah Hadikusuma

=== Recurring ===
- Voke Victoria as Vernie Calista
- Ben Joshua as Noah Ananta Hadikusuma
- Angel Karamoy as Maudy Alexandra
- Christ Laurent as Elang Putra Gemilang
- Lydia Kandou as Ratna Ningsih
- Frans Mohede as Damar Teguh Daneswara
- Atalarik Syach as Surya Riyadi Setiawan
- Sasha Alexa as Nadine Widyastuti
- Dosma Hazenbosch as Bianca Airin Setiawan
- Mariana Putri as Lusiana
- Teuku Dino as Baron
- Bianconeri Azhari as Arkana Pandya Hadikusuma
- Pisca Maharani as Sarni
- Rendy Kusdiana as Carlo
- Clara Kaizer as Imas
- Azalea Iskandar as Cindy
- Alvin Smith as Dennis
- James Thomas as Jamie
- Joko Apriyono as Joshua
- Rio Destha as Bram Pramudya
- Rezca Syam as Arthur
- Eloy Maharani as Eliana
- Rizky Alatas as Kelvin Bastian
- Regina Alya as Cindy
- Lily Zalea as Nadira
- Duway as Chandra Wiryawan
- Oding Siregar az Bastian
- Rachquel Nesia as Diandra Maharany Daneswara
- Masayu Anastasia as Syafira Dewi Damayanti
- Ponco Buwono as Ardan Sutejo
- Jeri Alfandi as Ricco
- Rivaldi Mulyana as Doni
- Wiwid Razak as Indah Kusumadewi
- Flo Aakster as Ayu
- Pierre Gruno as Haryono Hadikusuma
- Woro Gia as Imelda
- Anastasja Rina as Yati Suyati
- Tabah Penemuan Siregar as Guntur Daneswara
- Jhon Jawir as Sujono
- Riza Syah as Marcel Abimanyu
- Faradina Tika as Yuniar
- Jameelah Saleem as Arsy
- Xavier Nainggolan as Ale
- Putri Nabila as Niken
- Valeria Stahl Kaliey as Adelia
- Claudia Andhara as Gladys
- Emma Warokka as Pamela
- Uchi Johar as Nani
- Devi Ginong as Neneng
- Ayu Inten as Rianti
- Oka Antara as Aditya Hatadipura
- Queen Lubis as Nadia Rasya Hatadipura
- Rully Fiss as Ari Wibowo
- Irsan Ardira as Ari Nugraha
- Galih Leo as Yudo

== Production ==
=== Casting ===
Glenca Chysara was confirmed to play female lead, Amira. Ben Joshua was reported to play Noah. Angel Karamoy was cast as Maudy.

== Awards and nominations ==
Year	Award	Category	Recipient	Result	Ref.
2025	Indonesian Drama Series Awards	Favorite Male Lead Actor in a Drama Series	Lucky Perdana	Nominated	
2025	Indonesian Drama Series Awards	Favorite Female Lead in a Drama Series	Glenca Chysara	Nominated	
2025	Indonesian Drama Series Awards	Favorite Supporting Actor in a Drama Series	Ben Joshua	Nominated	
2025	Indonesian Drama Series Awards	Antagonist in Favorite Drama Series	Angel Karamoy	Nominated	
2025	Indonesian Drama Series Awards	Favorite Child Actor in Drama Series	Bianconeri Azhari	Nominated	
2025	Indonesian Drama Series Awards	Favorite Couples in Drama Series (Amira — Biru)	Glenca Chysara & Lucky Perdana	Nominated	
2025	Indonesian Drama Series Awards	Favorite Drama Series Director	Gita Asmara	Nominated	
2025	Festival Film Bandung	Best Actor	Lucky Perdana	Nominated	
2025	Festival Film Bandung	Best Actress	Voke Victoria	Nominated	
