= Rintik Terakhir =

Indonesian teen television series

- Genre: Teen; Drama
- Based on: Rintik Terakhir by Sri Puji Hartini
- Screenplay by: Fiona Mahdalena
- Story by: Fiona Mahdalena
- Directed by: Sondang Pratama
- Starring: Aisyah Aqilah; Jeff Smith; Adzana Ashel; Fadly Faisal; Mona Ratuliu; Lorenzo Gibbs; Femila Sinukaban; Ryan Winter; Farell Akbar
- Theme music composer: Ariel Noah
- Opening theme: "Semua Tentang Kita" by Ariel Noah
- Ending theme: "Semua Tentang Kita" by Ariel Noah
- Composers: Nicanoors; Rico Hutajulu
- Country of origin: Indonesia
- Original language: Indonesian
- No. of seasons: 1
- No. of episodes: 8

Production
- Executive producers: Derrick Heng; Ajivit Dutta; Lesley Simpson; Toha Essa
- Producers: Oswin Bonifanz; Agung Priyanto Dwi Nugroho
- Editor: DK Senja
- Camera setup: Multi-camera
- Running time: 45 minutes
- Production company: Unlimited Production

Original release
- Network: Viu; MAXstream
- Release: 20 August – 11 September 2025

Related
- Aku Tak Membenci Hujan

Rintik Terakhir is an Indonesian teen television series produced by Unlimited Production which aired from 20 August 2025 to 11 September 2025 on Viu and MAXstream based on the Wattpad story of the same title by Sri Puji Hartini. It stars Aisyah Aqilah, Jeff Smith, and Adzana Ashel. This series is a sequel of Aku Tak Membenci Hujan.

== Plot ==
Karang Samudra Daneswara awakens from a coma and realizes his body is now controlled by a figure named Arutala. For three years, Arutala has disrupted Karang's life by causing his grandmother to reject him, distance herself from Launa, and instead fall in love with another girl named Utari.

Amidst the chaos, Karang struggles to regain control of his life. He wants to restore his love for Launa, repair his relationship with his family, and erase the scars Arutala left behind. But can someone truly return to themselves after everything has been destroyed?

== Cast ==
- Aisyah Aqilah as Launa Felicia Damaris
- Jeff Smith as Karang Samudra Daneswara / Arutala Sembagi Daneswara
- Adzana Ashel as Utari
- Fadly Faisal as Lingga
- Yessica Tamara as Gladys
- Lorenzo Gibbs as Lukka Shah Kara
- Femila Sinukaban as Rain Oktara
- Ryan Winter as Orion Sagara
- Mona Ratuliu as Andira Deepa
- Santana Sartana as Pramana Daneswara
- Farell Akbar as Laut Biru Daneswara
- Daniel Leo as Anwar
- Oded Kravitz as Udin

== Production ==
=== Development ===
In June 2025, Telkomsel announced a new series titled Rintik Terakhir, a collaboration between MaxStream and Viu.

=== Casting ===
Ashel and Chika, former members of JKT48, reunite to play Utari and Gladys.
