= Ustadz Solmed =

Indonesian Islamic preacher and actor (born 1983)

Ustad Sholeh Mahmoed Nasution
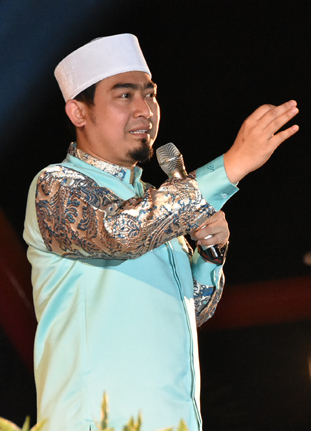
- Ustadz Solmed in 2019
- Born: Sholeh Mahmoed Nasution; July 19, 1983 (age 42); Jakarta, Indonesia
- Other name: Ustadz Solmed
- Occupation: Islamic preacher
- Years active: 2000 - present
- Spouse(s): Dewi Yulianti (divorced); April Jasmine
- Children: Sultan Mahmoed Qusyairi
- Parent(s): H. Nadjamuddin Nasution; Hj. Salmah Lubis
- Website: SholehMahmoed

Sholeh Mahmoed Nasution (born 19 July 1983), colloquially known as Ustadz Solmed, is an Indonesian Islamic preacher, speaker, and actor. Sholeh was first known as the champion in the speech and national lecture contest at Istiqlal Mosque in 2000. Since then, he has been active in both pop televangelism and acting business. He is an alumnus of Syarif Hidayatullah State Islamic University Jakarta.

== Career ==
From 2011 to 2012, he appeared in the Islamic soap opera Pesantren & Rock n' Roll as a religious teacher of the pesantren, and in another soap opera Si Biang Kerok. From 2015 to 2016, he owned his televangelist program Kata Ustadz Solmed on the national television network SCTV. During the 2017 Jakarta gubernatorial election, he was a vocal supporter of Anies Baswedan against the incumbent opponent Basuki Tjahaja Purnama, and led several congregational prayers to rally the support.

== Personal life ==
Sholeh was born in the family of speaker and actor, H. Nadjamuddin Nasution and Hj. Salmah Lubis. He married Dewi Yulianti on March 5, 2006, but eventually divorced. He married for the second time with a TV actress April Jasmine on November 11, 2011. Their first son Sultan Mahmoed Qusyairi was born on July 22, 2013. Sholeh is of Batak, specifically Mandailing descent.

== Controversy ==
On April 29, 2016, Sholeh was reportedly persecuted by a group of people in Serang, Banten, for arriving late to a lecture. Sholeh arrived late at 00:00 in the morning due to the committee giving him the wrong information about the venue, thus making him take the longer route to get to the place. Sholeh had denied the news of the persecution at first, but later he proceeded to the prosecution of the committee by appointing Hotmas Paris Hutapea as his attorney.

On June 3, 2017, Sholeh was arrested by the airport security of the immigration authority at Changi Airport, Singapore. He was detained in an isolated room for 10 hours and endured interrogations for an unknown reason.

== Filmography ==
- Pesantren & Rock n' Roll (2011)
- Si Biang Kerok (2012)
- Kata Ustadz Solmed (2015)
