= Main Api =

Indonesian thriller drama television series

- Genre: Drama; Thriller
- Written by: Riheam Junianti
- Directed by: Rizal Mantovani
- Starring: Luna Maya; Darius Sinathrya; Marcelino Lefrandt; Audi Marissa; Joshua Pandelaki; Shafira K. Doyle; Yogi Tama; Vidya Ully; Rachel Mikhayla
- Opening theme: "Playing With Fire" by Tevy Badoa
- Ending theme: "Playing With Fire" by Tevy Badoa
- Composer: Joseph S. Djafar
- Country of origin: Indonesia
- Original language: Indonesian
- No. of seasons: 1
- No. of episodes: 10

Production
- Executive producers: Jeff Han; Juan Xiang; Ram Soraya
- Producer: Rocky Soraya
- Cinematography: Beben Helmi
- Editor: Gita Miaji
- Camera setup: Multi-camera
- Production company: Hitmaker Studios

Original release
- Network: WeTV
- Release: 29 November 2024 – 1 February 2025

Main Api (English: The Dangerous Affair) is an Indonesian television series produced by Hitmaker Studios which premiered on 29 November 2024 on WeTV. It stars Luna Maya, Darius Sinathrya, Marcelino Lefrandt and Audi Marissa.

== Plot ==
Alex is an architect. He has a harmonious family and has been married for 10 years. From his marriage to Lara, Alex has two children, a son and a daughter.

Despite having a family, outside the house Alex is known as a big-time playboy. Marriage does not even prevent Alex from having relationships with many women in every city he visits, while working as an architect.

Alex never fails to amaze every woman he meets with his charisma and good looks. However, when Alex meets Nadine and finds out that she is the wife of a prominent investor, Alex challenges himself to win Nadine's heart.

One thing he doesn't know, his decision actually ensnares Alex in a dangerous affair that threatens the lives of Alex and his family. Alex must also face the consequences of his actions when his family's safety is threatened by a third person, a psychopath.

== Cast ==
- Luna Maya as Nadine
- Darius Sinathrya as Alex
- Marcelino Lefrandt as Erwin
- Audi Marissa as Lara
- Anggia Chan as Citra
- Dwi Surya as Bimo
- Yogi Tama as Daniel
- Rachel Mikhayla as Abel
- Patrik Cuncic as Kelvin
- Joshua Pandelaki as Pandu
- Euodia Octavia as Githa
- Farizi as Galang
- Shafira K. Doyle as Kinar
- Jack Arsene as Dio
- Reea J.C. Donnelly as Mina
- Rani Anjesline as Jani
- Akmal Fadh as Rudi
- Thalia Rosalinda as Merci
- Danang Danish as Tio
- Rini Hartono as Indri
- Adrian Aliman as Lukman
- Vidya Ully as Catherine
- Rhani as Dr. Vena
- Gabby Ayu as Fio

== Production ==
=== Development ===
In May 2024, WeTV announced a new series titled Main Api.
