= Keluarga yang Tak Dirindukan =

2026 Indonesian family drama television series

- Genre: Family drama
- Directed by: Sanjeev Ram Kishan
- Starring: Arbani Yasiz; Miqdad Addausy; Nabila Zavira; Lazuardy Nasution; Tiara Permata; Kiki Narendra; Irene Librawati; Duway; Adinda Cresheilla; Ponco Buwono
- Opening theme: "Tetap Untukmu" by Ria Zippie
- Ending theme: "Tetap Untukmu" by Ria Zippie
- Composers: Nikanor; Rico Hutajulu
- Country of origin: Indonesia
- Original language: Indonesian
- No. of seasons: 1
- No. of episodes: 55

Production
- Executive producer: Shania Punjabi
- Producer: Manoj Punjabi
- Cinematography: Welly Djuanda
- Camera setup: Multi-camera
- Running time: 90 minutes
- Production company: MD Entertainment

Original release
- Network: MDTV; Netflix
- Release: 13 February – 7 April 2026

Keluarga yang Tak Dirindukan is an Indonesian television series produced by Manoj Punjabi under MD Entertainment which aired on 13 February 2026 on MDTV and Netflix. It stars Arbani Yasiz, Miqdad Addausy, and Nabila Zavira.

== Plot ==
The lives of three siblings, Firzha, Thoriq, and their adopted sister, Zahra, were suddenly shattered when their father, Santoso, suffered an accident.

This tragic incident left Santoso unable to work. This ordeal became a real test for Santoso's children.

Amidst overwhelming medical needs, the three were caught in a dilemma: whether to sacrifice their own interests or let their father suffer in old age.

The conflict escalated when Firzha and Thoriq responded to their father's tragedy in different ways. Their decisions created new problems that threatened the family's integrity. Meanwhile, Zahra, an adopted child, offered a new perspective on loyalty and sacrifice.

== Cast ==
- Arbani Yasiz as Thoriq
- Nabila Zavira as Zahra
- Miqdad Addausy as Firzha
- Kiki Narendra as Santoso
- Irene Librawati as Faridah
- Lazuardy Nasution as Angga
- Lexia Aaliyah as Michelle
- Tiara Permata as Nurani
- Adinda Cresheilla as Shinta
- Raya Nurcintya as Dinda
- Jackie Kezia as Lia
- Duway as Aldo
- Ponco Buwono as Bagas
- Decy Erlita as Sarah
- Yovi Saddan as Candra
- Cantika Ratna as Tantri

== Production ==
=== Casting ===
This series marks Kiki Narendra's Indonesian television debut as Santoso. Arbani Yasiz was confirmed for the male lead, Thoriq. Miqdad Addausy was roped portray Firza.
