= Jangan Salahkan Aku Selingkuh =

Indonesian drama television series

- Also known as: Pardon My Affair
- Genre: Romance; Revenge
- Created by: Agung Saputra
- Based on: Jangan Salahkan Aku Selingkuh by Renita April
- Screenplay by: Oka Aurora
- Directed by: Rudi Soedjarwo
- Starring: Marshanda; Giorgino Abraham; Stefan William; Dosma Hazenbosch; Emil Mario; Endhita; Ruth Marini; Fajar Rezky; Aditya Suryo; Steven Tanady; Angga Putra; Gerald Yo; Dea Lestari; Fendy Chow; Hami Diah; Ike Muti; Sherly Dwi Fitri; Krisna Murti Wibowo; Ayu Inten
- Theme music composer: Marshanda
- Opening theme: "In Love Again" oleh Marshanda
- Ending theme: "In Love Again" oleh Marshanda
- Composer: Adam Putra
- Country of origin: Indonesia
- Original language: Indonesian
- No. of seasons: 1
- No. of episodes: 8

Production
- Executive producers: Jeff Han; Juan Xiang
- Producer: Agung Saputra
- Editors: Azka Amar Kusumah; Vycko Hadi; Ridho Trisman Ramadhan
- Camera setup: Multi-camera
- Production company: Leo Pictures

Original release
- Network: Tencent Video
- Release: 26 September – 16 November 2024

Jangan Salahkan Aku Selingkuh (English: Pardon My Affair) is an Indonesian television series produced by Leo Pictures which aired from 23 September 2024 to 16 November 2024 on WeTV. It stars Marshanda, Giorgino Abraham, and Stefan William.

== Plot ==
Anna is a successful and well-known marriage counselor. Unfortunately, Anna has to face the bitter truth that her husband is Dimas. Anna feels like a failure as a wife, especially considering her profession as a marriage consultant.

Although Dimas and Anna's marriage is rarely marked by arguments, one harsh reality looms over their lives. Anna has been diagnosed with childlessness, causing Dimas to slowly lose hope of having children with his wife.

In this complicated and desperate situation, Dimas is tempted to have an affair, which results in his mistress becoming pregnant. When the truth is revealed, Dimas, filled with guilt, tells Anna the truth. This confession undoubtedly breaks Anna's heart.

Anna and Dimas's relationship becomes increasingly complicated, plunging Anna into a marital conflict filled with betrayal and pain. As a result, Anna plots revenge for her husband's misdeeds.

Anna plans this revenge to expose Dimas's lies and deceit while at work. Anna wasn't alone; her friend Reyhan accompanied her in carrying out her act.

Reyhan was known as a conglomerate with superhuman powers. Unbeknownst to her, Reyhan also harbored genuine love for Anna. So, will Anna succeed in carrying out her revenge? Can she find happiness after suffering betrayal and overcoming the bitterness of love?

== Cast ==
- Marshanda as Anna Sumadibrata
- Giorgino Abraham as Dimas Sumadibrata
- Stefan William as Reyhan Sanjaya
- Dosma Hazenbosch as Lisa Angelina Hadyapura
- Emil Mario as Jay
- Aurelia Lourdes as Kei
- Endhita as Yuni
- Ruth Marini as Ida Rosalina
- Wilmy Risakotta as dr. Arul
- Ami Damita Amira as Desi
- Fajar Rezky as Boni
- Aditya Suryo as Tito
- Steven Tanady as Ferry
- Angga Putra as Ijal
- Gerald Yo as Ajil
- Dea Lestari as Vira
- Fendy Chow as Ali
- Lala Choo as Indi
- Fitria Rasyidi as Cecil
- Hami Diah as Konsumen
- Ike Muti as Bu Tuti
- Alit Aryani Willems as Tini
- Sherly Dwi Fitri as Bu Joko
- Krisna Murti Wibowo as William Wongso
- Ayu Inten as Pengacara

== Production ==
=== Casting ===
Marshanda was confirmed to play female lead, Anna. For the role of Anna, Marshanda lost 21 kilograms. Stefan William was selected to portray Reyhan. Giorgino Abraham was cast as Dimas. Dosma were cast to portray a negative role, Lisa.

=== Reception ===
The series was trending in 26 countries on the WeTV app.
