= Tiba-Tiba Brondong =

2026 Indonesian television series

- Genre: Romantic comedy
- Written by: Fiona Mahdalena; Aluna Alwy
- Directed by: Sondang Pratama
- Starring: Tatjana Saphira; Fadi Alaydrus; Cinta Brian; Kimberly Angela; Isad Gaddafi; Fitria Rasyidi; Arsyla Shakila; Madkucil; Wina Marrino; Volland Humonggio; Vidya Ully; Gisella Anastasia
- Opening theme: "Tiba-Tiba Cinta" by Maudy Ayunda
- Ending theme: "Tiba-Tiba Cinta" by Maudy Ayunda
- Country of origin: Indonesia
- Original language: Indonesian
- No. of seasons: 1
- No. of episodes: 9

Production
- Executive producers: Lionel Chng; Lesley Simpson; Avijit Dutta; Toha Essa; Evy Ruslie
- Producers: Oswin Bonifanz; Agung PD Nugroho
- Editor: Gita Miaji
- Camera setup: Multi-camera
- Running time: 30-39 minutes
- Production company: Unlimited Production

Original release
- Network: Viu; MAXstream
- Release: 16 February – 13 March 2026

Tiba-Tiba Brondong is an Indonesian television series produced by Unlimited Production which premiered on 16 February 2026 on Viu and MAXstream. Starring Tatjana Saphira, and Fadi Alaydrus.

== Plot ==
At 35, Bella is a popular and calm psychology lecturer. However, she feels empty inside. Her family pressures her to get married, leading her to impulsively try a dating app. Through the app, Bella connects with Langit, a charming and witty man.

He seems too perfect to be real. However, Langit is the only man who understands Bella and allows her to be herself. After a month of close, intense conversations, Bella is shocked to discover that Langit is actually a 19-year-old high school graduate. Even more shocking, Langit appears as her new student.

Angry and uncertain, Bella tries to distance herself. However, Langit's sincerity draws her back. As Bella's feelings for Langit grow stronger, her life begins to unfold in ways she never expected.

== Cast ==
- Tatjana Saphira as Isabella Kamila Rahardja
- Fadi Alaydrus as Langit Sagara
- Cinta Brian as Giandra
- Kimberly Angela as Ziva
- Isad Gaddafi as Yusuf Karmela
- Fitria Rasyidi as Tara Shadira
- Arsyla Shakila as Freya
- Madkucil as Bayu
- Wina Marrino as Lidya
- Volland Humonggio as Dr. Damian Baskara
- Vidya Ully as Deasy
- Gisella Anastasia as Gisel
