= Secret High School =

2025 Indonesian teen television series

- Genre: Thriller; Teen; Drama
- Based on: Scret High School by Queena
- Starring: Tissa Biani; Yesaya Abraham; Rezca Syam; Dafina Jamasir; Olla Ramlan; Andy William; Rafly Altama; Gabriella Quinlyn
- Country of origin: Indonesia
- Original language: Indonesian
- No. of seasons: 1
- No. of episodes: 9

Production
- Camera setup: Multi-camera
- Production company: Skytree Pictures

Original release
- Network: Viu; MAXstream
- Release: 3 October – 31 October 2025

Secret High School is an Indonesian thriller television series which aired from 3 October 2025 to 31 October 2025 on Viu and Maxstream. Produced by Skytree Pictures, it starred Tissa Biani, and Yesaya Abraham. This series based on Queena's AU's Secret High School.

== Plot ==
The story begins when he undertakes a crucial undercover mission to save his younger brother, Seno, from a mysterious threat looming.

Shaka disguises himself as a student at Sudharma High School, where he discovers crucial clues to his brother's safety. However, the school environment plays tricks on his plans: trap after trap begins to unfold, orchestrated by the seemingly friendly but intriguing school authorities.

At the same time, Shaka faces an unexpected reality. He interacts and eventually teams up with Aura, a young teacher with sharp instincts.

== Cast ==
- Tissa Biani as Aura
- Yesaya Abraham as Arshaka Zion Adipati
- Ryan Winter as Azka
- Febriant Teja as Seno
- Florian Rutters as Jayden
- Sheryl Jesslyn as Sonya
- Andy William as Riky
- Rafly Altama as Januar
- Tristan Molina as Jarrel
- Ajeng Fauziah as Niken
- David Saragih as Badman
- Dafina Jamasir as Aini
- Rezca Syam as Juna
- Gabriella Quinlyn as Tasya
- Bianura Azka Ghifari as Andre Adiprana
- Helmy Wilson as Radit
- Zamrud Lazuardi as Pak Rahadi
- Satria Towel as Beni
- Asyaraaf Barawas as Arsakha Zion Adipati
- Adam Xavier as Seno
- Olla Ramlan as Maria
- Jordan as Marvin

== Production ==
=== Development ===
In June 2025, Telkomsel announced a new series titled Secret High School, a collaboration between MaxStream and Viu.
