= Jejak Duka Diandra =

Indonesian drama television series

- Genre: Romance; Revenge
- Screenplay by: Serena Luna
- Story by: Serena Luna
- Directed by: Epoy S. Pradipta
- Starring: Michelle Ziudith; Rio Dewanto; Ibrahim Risyad; Andi Annisa; Bizael Tanasale; Baiti Syaghaf; Ira Wibowo; Anastasya Panggabean; Denny Weller; Adipura; Ana Pinem
- Theme music composer: Ade Govinda
- Opening theme: "Setidaknya" by Maysha Jhuan
- Ending theme: "Setidaknya" by Maysha Jhuan
- Composer: Wiwiex Soedarno
- Country of origin: Indonesia
- Original language: Indonesian
- No. of seasons: 1
- No. of episodes: 145

Production
- Executive producer: David S. Suwarto
- Producer: Iwan S. Manan
- Cinematography: Asep Kalila
- Editors: Dwi Indah; Deni Surajab
- Camera setup: Multi-camera
- Running time: ±85 minutes
- Production company: SinemArt

Original release
- Network: SCTV
- Release: 6 January – 21 June 2026

Jejak Duka Diandra is an Indonesian television series which premiered on 6 January 2026 to 21 June 2026 on SCTV. The series is directed by Epoy S. Pradipta and stars Michelle Ziudith, Rio Dewanto, and Bizael Tanasale.

== Synopsis ==
Diandra thought love would save her life. However, her marriage to Dimitri instead dragged her into a whirlpool of slander, secrets, and bitter choices that changed everything. With the wounds that.

== Cast ==
- Michelle Ziudith as Diandra Putri Shanna Arasya
- Rio Dewanto as Dimitri Aidan Wijaya
- Ibrahim Risyad as Raga
- Andi Annisa as Vivian
- Akbar Kurniawan as Yordan
- Bizael Tanasale as Jupiter
- Ira Wibowo as Laras
- Dominique Sanda as Lidya
- Rudi Kawilarang as Adam Wijaya
- Opie Kumis as Eduardo
- Anastasya Panggabean as Melissa
- Billy Boedjanger as Umar
- Yoelitta Palar as Mira
- Denny Weller as Danny
- Adipura as Adiputra Sentosa
- Ana Pinem as Rina
- Alesha Gwen as Freya
- Yusuf Bachtiar as Hardi
- Devina Aureel as Peri
- Baiti Syaghaf as Yunita Mahira Arasya
- Aulia Deas as Sari
- Regina Alya as Lilis
