= Rangga Nattra =

Indonesian actor and director (born 1989)

- Occupations: Actor; director
- Years active: 2011–present

Rangga Nattra (born July 18, 1989) is an Indonesian actor, director, and former radio announcer. Before directing television shows and films, Nattra was an announcer at a Bali radio station. In 2011 Rangga moved to Jakarta to host several TV programs.

His first project as a director of the sitcom, Keluarga Ben Ben (2016). Naatra would direct several films, Ngawur (2017), Kasih Ibu (2019), Xtra Absurd (2019), and Pencitraan (2019). Kasih Ibu was played at the 2019 Balinale Film Festival.

Nattra's debut as an actor was in the film, Darah Daging, in which he played the character, Rahmat. He starred alongside Ario Bayu. In 2020 he will be acting in two movies, Nona and Demi Waktu, a movie about Lafran Pane biography.

== Filmography ==
- Keluarga Ben Ben (Director, 2016)
- Ngawur (Director, 2017)
- Kasih Ibu (Actor, Director 2019)
- Xtra Absurd (Director, 2019)
- Pencitraan (Director, 2019)
- Darah Daging (Actor, 2019)
- Nona (Actor, 2020)
- Demi Waktu (Actor, 2020)
