= Mencintaimu Sekali Lagi =

Indonesian drama television series

- Genre: Melodrama; Romance
- Screenplay by: Donna Rosamayna
- Directed by: Rudi Aryanto
- Starring: Haico Van der Veken; Jonas Rivanno; Miller Khan; Sari Nila; Felix William Smith; Rachquel Nesia; Kevin Royano; Rebecca Tamara; Mischa Chandrawinata; Asha Assuncao; Evan Marvino; Roby Tremonti
- Theme music composer: Melly Goeslaw
- Opening theme: "Sampai Menutup Mata" by Mahalini
- Ending theme: "Sampai Menutup Mata" by Mahalini
- Composer: Joseph S. Djafar
- Country of origin: Indonesia
- Original language: Indonesian
- No. of seasons: 1
- No. of episodes: 290

Production
- Executive producers: Filriady Kusmara; Kamil Wahyudi; Mudakir Rifai
- Producer: Reno Marciano
- Cinematography: Iin Khinanta
- Camera setup: Multi-camera
- Running time: 60 minutes
- Production company: MNC Pictures

Original release
- Network: RCTI
- Release: 25 December 2024 – 13 October 2025

Mencintaimu Sekali Lagi is an Indonesian television series produced by MNC Pictures which aired from 25 December 2024 to 13 October 2025 on RCTI. It starring Haico Van der Veken, Jonas Rivanno, and Miller Khan.

== Plot ==
Arini, a successful career woman, is deeply wounded by her boyfriend, Donny,'s affair with her close friend, Laura. This deep wound has left Arini mired in grief, but her mother tries to lift her up by introducing Lingga, the son of a family friend, as a potential life partner. Although initially resistant and unprepared for a new relationship, Arini slowly begins to open her heart to Lingga.

Lingga's sincerity and attention make her believe that true love can be found even amidst lingering wounds. However, their love story isn't as easy as imagined. Lingga's older brother, Emil, has secretly harbored feelings for Arini for a long time, creating tension in their relationship. Lingga and Emil are caught in a difficult dilemma, as Emil also wants to pursue his love for Arini, even though he knows his younger brother loves her too. Meanwhile, Arini finds herself in a quandary, feeling trapped between two men she knows and cares deeply about. The tension escalates when Arini has to choose between Lingga's sincere love or the new feelings that arise from Emil.

== Cast ==
=== Main ===
- Haico Van der Veken as Arini Ayuningtyas Darsono
- Jonas Rivanno as Lingga Jati Gunawan
- Miller Khan as Emilio Pratama Gunawan

=== Recurring ===
- Sari Nila as Pertiwi
- Felix William Smith sebagai Aditya Gunawan
- Elizabeth Christine as Ratih Purwaningrum
- Lucky Alamsyah as Mulyono Darsono
- Diva Almira as Ajeng Puspita Darsono
- Malida Dinda as Widya Kirani Darsono
- Edwin Syarief as Jaka Setiawan
- Rully Fiss as Ari Wibowo
- Galih Leo as Yudo
- Irsan Ardira as Ari Nugraha
- Jennifer Eve as Nadia
- La Rheina Isabelle Bishop as Hanifah
- Raden Muhammad Hafi as Angga
- Akmal Fadh as Dierja
- Jovita Karen as Angel Lavinia
- Resva Ziya Shanika as Saras
- Shafa Siregar as Iin
- Jantuk as Darwin
- Krisna Keitaro as Damar Langit
- Afifah Ifah'nda as Aliya
- Rebecca Tamara as Tamara
- Boy Permana as Roy
- Fadel Levi as Bima Sakti
- Lania Fira as Elvira Aulia Putri
- Rexy Rizky as Bara Wirawijaya
- Verlita Evelyn as Raden Ayu Paramitha Larasati Pusponegoro
- Rachquel Nesia as Cintya
- Kevin Royano as Robby Santoso
- Kevin Andrean as Donny Prayogo
- Olivia Desvina Putri as Laura
- Lisa Mae Verbaekel as Laura
- Wiwid Razak as Desy
- Asha Assuncao as Citra Silvania Ramadhani
- Evan Marvino as Fajar Anugrah Purnomo
- Putty Noor as Sofia Mahaputri Prayogo
- Amelia Marda as Melissa Oktavini
- Dadang Sopyian as Haris
- Joshua Otay as Rama Suwandi
- Stephanie Kaluna as Sri Ningsih
- Rowiena Umboh as Kartika
- Faby Marcelia as Mazaya
- Dibiy Dave as Omesh
- Roby Tremonti as Rio Ferdinan
- Mischa Chandrawinata as Gerry
- Hannah Hannon as Bintang
- Jerry Likumahwa as Lutfi
- Sulthan Gio as Dafa
- Anthony Xie as Samuel
- Kenya Nindia Elsa as Nindy
- Lea Ciarachel as Alisya Cakradinata
- Denny Weller as Dirgantara Mahesa
- Suhaidi Jamaan as Adi
- Fara Shakila as Kasih
- Ghea Youbi as Ghea
- Dimas Febriana as Dimas

== Awards and nominations ==
| Year | Award | Category | Recipient | Result | Ref. |
|---|---|---|---|---|---|
| 2025 | Indonesian Drama Series Awards | Favorite Drama Series Program | Mencintaimu Sekali Lagi | Won | |
| 2025 | Indonesian Drama Series Awards | Favorite Male Lead Actor in a Drama Series | Jonas Rivanno | Nominated | |
| 2025 | Indonesian Drama Series Awards | Favorite Female Lead in a Drama Series | Haico Van der Veken | Won | |
| 2025 | Indonesian Drama Series Awards | Favorite Supporting Actor in a Drama Series | Miller Khan | Nominated | |
| 2025 | Indonesian Drama Series Awards | Favorite Supporting Actress in a Drama Series | Afifah Ifah'nda | Nominated | |
| 2025 | Indonesian Drama Series Awards | Antagonist in Favorite Drama Series | Miller Khan | Won | |
| 2025 | Indonesian Drama Series Awards | Favorite Light Characters in Drama Series | Rully Fiss | Nominated | |
| 2025 | Indonesian Drama Series Awards | Favorite Couples in Drama Series (Arini — Lingga) | Haico Van der Veken & Jonas Rivanno | Nominated | |
| 2025 | Indonesian Drama Series Awards | Favorite Drama Series Writer | Donna Rosamayna | Won | |
| 2025 | Indonesian Drama Series Awards | Favorite Drama Series Director | Rudi Aryanto | Nominated | |
| 2025 | Indonesian Drama Series Awards | Favorite Drama Series Soundtracks | "Sampai Menutup Mata", Mahalini | Won | |
| 2025 | Indonesian Television Awards | Most Popular Primetime Drama Programs | Mencintaimu Sekali Lagi | Won | |
| 2025 | Festival Film Bandung | Best Actress - Female | Haico Van der Veken | Nominated | |
