= Mahalini Raharja =

Mahalini Raharja Febian
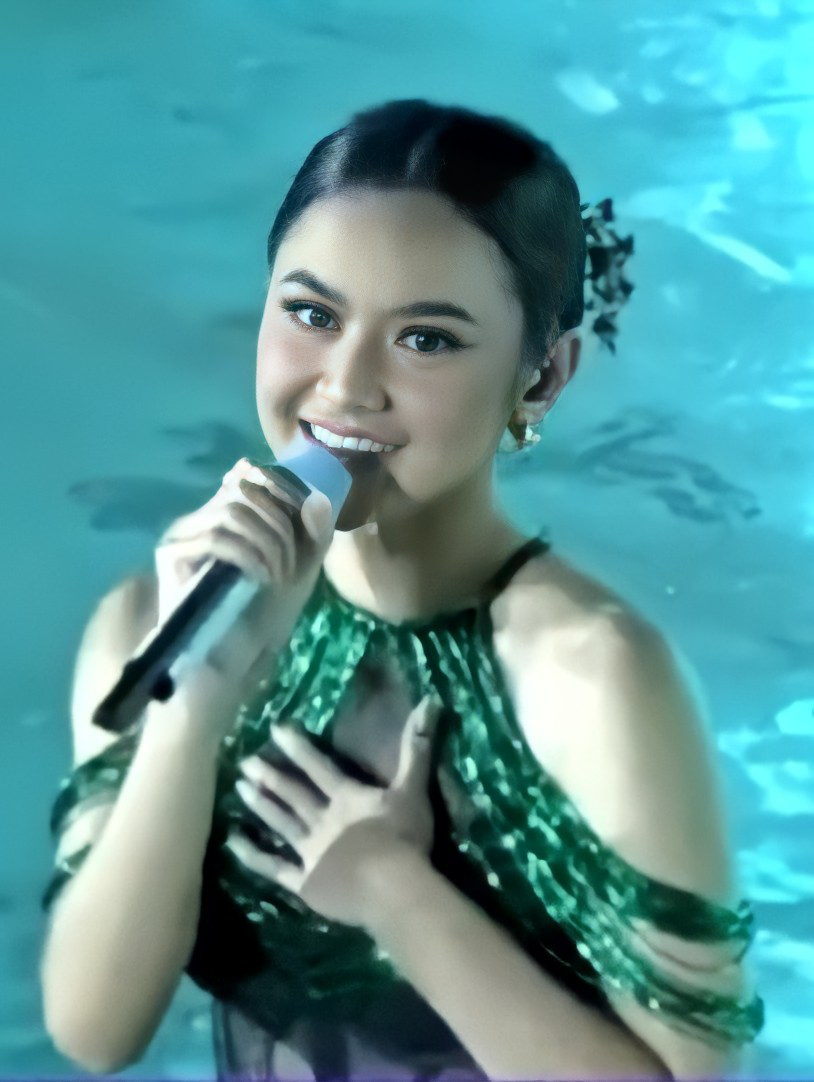
- Mahalini in 2022
- Born: Ni Luh Ketut Mahalini Ayu Raharja; March 4, 2000 (age 26); Denpasar, Bali, Indonesia
- Occupations: Singer-songwriter; Actress
- Years active: 2015—present
- Spouse: Rizky Febian (m. 2024)
- Musical career
- Genres: Pop; pop ballad
- Instrument: Vocals
- Years active: 2015—present
- Label: Hits

Ni Luh Ketut Mahalini Ayu Raharja (Balinese: ᬦᬶᬮᬸᬄᬓᭂᬢᬸᬢ᭄ᬫᬳᬮᬶᬦᬶᬅᬬᬸᬭᬳᬃᬚ; born March 4, 2000) is an Indonesian singer and actress. She is known for placing fifth on the tenth season of Indonesian Idol in 2020.

Mahalini is one of the Indonesian artists with the most monthly listeners on Spotify, 10.3 million in early June 2023 (the highest after Rich Brian and Niki). She also has four songs with over 100 million streams on the platform, namely "Melawan Restu", "Sisa Rasa", "Kisah Sempurna", and "Sial".

== Early life and education ==
Ni Luh Ketut Mahalini Ayu Raharja was born on March 4, 2000 in Denpasar, Bali to parents I Gede Suraharja and Ni Nyoman Serini. Her name is based on the Balinese naming system, where "Ni Luh" is a prefix for female children while "Ketut" is a given name for fourth-born children. Mahalini was born into an ethnic Balinese and Hindu family, then she converted to Islam before marrying Rizky Febian.

Mahalini started participating in local singing competitions during junior high school. She then continued her education in SMA Negeri 1 Denpasar, where she received an achievement scholarship for her singing ability. In 2018, Mahalini studied Dentistry at Mahasaraswati Denpasar University before deciding to take a break to focus on her musical career in 2022.

== Career ==
Mahalini participated in the tenth season of Indonesian Idol in 2019. She had previously auditioned in the same singing competition on the ninth season but did not pass. On February 3, 2020, she was eliminated from the show and placed fifth.

Performances on Indonesian Idol X
Round	Song	Original Singer	Result
Audition	"I Have Nothing"	Whitney Houston	Golden Ticket
Elimination 1: Acapella	""Lay Me Down"	Sam Smith	Safe
Elimination 2: Grup: Best of the Best	"Best Part"	Daniel Caesar & H.E.R	Safe
Elimination 3: Solo	"Chandelier"	Sia	Safe
Showcase 1	"Bukan Cinta Biasa"	Afgan	Judges choice, saved by Ari Lasso
Final Showcase 1	"Hanya Memuji"	Shanty ft. Marcell Siahaan	Safe
Spekta 1	"Cinta Mati"	Agnes Monica & Ahmad Dhani	Safe
Spekta 2	"Use Somebody"	Kings of Leon	Safe
Spekta 3	"Cinta Pertama dan Terakhir"	Sherina Munaf	Bottom 3
Spekta 4	"Symphony"	Clean Bandit & Zara Larsson	Safe
Spekta 5	"Jar Of Hearts"	Christina Perri	Safe
Spekta 6	"Rise Up"	Andra Day	Safe
Spekta 7	"Bukan Untukku"	Rio Febrian	Safe
Spekta 8	"Satu Jam Saja"	Zaskia Gotik	Safe
Spekta 9	"Impossible"	Shontelle	Safe
Spekta 10	"Hanya Rindu"	Andmesh Kamaleng	Bottom 3
Spekta 11	"Shallow"	Lady Gaga & Bradley Cooper	Eliminated
Spekta 11	"Hampa"	Ari Lasso	Eliminated

== Discography ==
=== Studio album ===
List of studio albums with selected details
Title	Detail Album
Fábula	Release : 23 January 2023; Label : Hits Records; Format : Digital download

=== Compilation album ===
List of compilation albums with selected details
Title	Detail Album
Musikini Super Hits 3	Release: 23 February 2022; Label: Jagonya Musik & Sport Indonesia; Format: CD
Journey of Love	Release: 25 February 2022; Label: Hits Records; Format: Digital download

=== Single ===
As lead singer
Title	Year	Highest Position				Album
Title	Year	IDN	IDN Songs	MYS Songs	MYS	Album
"Bawa Dia Kembali"	2015	5	5	*	*	Non-album
"Aku yang Salah" (with Nuca)	2020	—	*	*	*	Non-album
"Melawan Restu"	2021	—	11	*	*	Fábula
"Sisa Rasa"	2021	39	3	*	*	Fábula
"Janji Kita" (bersama Nuca)	2021	—	*	*	*	Journey of Love & Musikini Super Hits 3
"Kisah Sempurna"	2022	—	6	—	*	Fábula
"You're Mine" (bersama Rizky Febian)	2022	—	—	—	*	Non-album
"Satu Tuju" (bersama Rizky Febian)	2022	—	—	—	*	Non-album
"Sial"	2023	6	1	3	*	Fábula
"Mati-Matian"	2024	2	4	24	*	KOMA,
"Bermuara" (bersama Rizky Febian)	2024	9	15	—	*	Non-album
"Sampai Menutup Mata"	2024	10	12	—	*	KOMA, Lagu Tema sinetron RCTI Mencintaimu Sekali Lagi
"Percuma"	2026	—	—	18	12	Non-album

=== Other charted songs ===
Title	Year	Highest position		Album
Title	Year	IDN Songs	MYS Songs	Album
"Sial"	2023	1	3	Fábula

=== Songwriting credits ===
List of songs written or co-written for other artists
Title	Year	Artist(s)	Album
"Lupakan Cinta"	2023	Rossa	Another Journey: The Beginning

== Filmography ==
=== Film ===
Year	Title	Role	Notes	Ref.
2021	Kapan Pindah Rumah	Kanaya		
2022	Kopi Pahit	Gendis		
2022	My Sassy Girl	Nisa	Cameo	

=== Web series ===
Year	Title	Role	Notes	Ref.
2022	Senja Hari Ini Indah	Nika	6 episodes	

=== Television show ===
Year	Title	Role	Notes
2021	Opera Van Java Sabtu Malam Kite Lagi	Sinden	8 episodes
