= Erratic =

Erratic may refer to:

- Erratic, a project of music artist Jan Robbe
- Glacial erratic, a piece of rock that differs from the size and type of rock native to the area in which it rests
- Erratic ant (Tapinoma erraticum), a species of ant
