= Frans Mohede =

Indonesian singer

- Born: Francois Henry Willem Mohede; 6 February 1976 (age 50); Jakarta, Indonesia
- Other name: Frans Lingua/Francois Lingua
- Occupations: Singer; actor; model; music producer; trainer; sports promoter
- Years active: 1993–present
- Spouse: Amara (m. 1999)
- Relatives: Mike Mohede (cousin)
- Musical career
- Genres: Jazz; R&B; Funk; Soul; Electronica; Folk
- Instrument: Voice
- Labels: Ris Music Wijaya International; Musica Studios; Ariola; Lingua Musik Indonesia

Francois Henry Willem Mohede (born 6 February 1976) is an Indonesian singer, actor, and Muay-thai instructor. He is the husband of the Indonesian actress Amara. He is a member of Lingua.

== Life and career ==
Mohede was born on 6 February 1976 in Jakarta, His family is a combination of Dutch Moluccan and Sangirese descent. He is the cousin of the indonesian R&B artist Mike Mohede.

He founded in 1996 with his friends musicians, Amara and Arie Widiawan, the trio of country pop, Lingua. He followed a career in acting in TV series, as his wife after 1999, their proximity is such that they are apparuts together more than a dozen times on the screen.

Being an expert in martial arts, he opened in 2007 in Jakarta, the first training center Muay-thai of Indonesia. Since 2013, he was appointed president of the MPI (Muay-Thai Professional Indonesia). In December 2014, Mohede with his wife opened a second training center in Bali, to continue promoting the sport across the country.

== Personal life ==
On 1 December 1999, Mohede married his childhood friend, the singer Amara who he was dating since 1991. The couple are not in the same religious denomination, so since Indonesian law makes it difficult to do interfaith marriage since 1974, the couple had a civil marriage to Hong Kong.

They are the parents of three sons: Mahija Nathaniel Sambarana Aryantawira (born 8 June 2004), Janitra Nathaniel Sambawikrama (born on 8 September 2006) and Rajaswa Nathaniel Singkarawang Mohede (born on 17 October 2008).

== Discography ==
=== With Lingua ===
==== Studio album ====
- Bila Kuingat (1996)
- Bintang (1998)
- Mampu Bertahan (2016)

==== Singles ====
- Good Times (2015)
- Arti Sebuah Keangkuhan (2017)
- Jangan Kau Henti (2019 version) (2019)
- Bila Kuingat (2019 version) (2019)
- Temani Malamku (2020)

== Filmography ==
=== Film ===
- Misi: 1511

=== Television ===
- Orde Cinta
- Bukan Pilihan
- Hadiah Terindah
- Azab Anak Tak Tau Diri

== Soap opera ==
- Mahligai Diatas Pasir
- Cinta Tak Pernah Salah
- Bukan Impian Semusim
- Kembali Ke Fitri
- Petualangan Intan & Oddi
- Aku Cinta Kamu
- Nyonya-Nyonya Sosialita
- Serpihan
- Lia

== Advertisements ==
- Laserin
- Allianz
