= Children of Heaven (2026 film) =

- Theatrical poster
- Directed by: Hanung Bramantyo
- Written by: Hanan Novianti; Oka Aurora
- Based on: Children of Heaven by Majid Majidi
- Produced by: Manoj Punjabi
- Starring: Jared Ali; Humaira Jahra; Andri Mashadi
- Cinematography: Faozan Rizal
- Edited by: Wawan I. Wibowo; Haris F. Syah
- Production company: MD Pictures
- Release date: 27 May 2026
- Country: Indonesia
- Language: Indonesian

Children of Heaven is a 2026 Indonesian family drama film directed by Hanung Bramantyo, written by Hanan Novianti and Oka Aurora. The film is a localized adaptation of the 1997 Iranian film directed by Majid Majidi. The film was released domestically on 27 May 2026.

== Plot ==
Set in 1980s Semarang, the story follows the livelihood of Ali and Zahra, two children of a financially struggling family. Similar to the original movie's plot, The film begins with Ali accidentally losing Zahra's repaired shoes in the middle of the market. After getting home, Ali tells Zahra about the shoes not to inform their parents considering their financial troubles. That night, Ali and Zahra both agree to share the same shoes. Zahra will wear them to school in the morning and return them at midday to Ali before his afternoon classes. Earlier that afternoon, Roy, a money collector, confronted their mother, Fatimah.

Ali's tardiness is noticed by his principal, who initially let him in. After answering a question correctly, Ali's homeroom teacher awarded him a pen, which he then gave to his sister. When he arrived late for the second time, Ali was told to go home. Out of pity, Ali's homeroom teacher successfully persuaded the principal to reconsider and let him in.

One day, Zahra notices her missing pink shoes worn by another student named Yeni. After class, Zahra follows her home and brings Ali along with her for the second time. They later found out that Yeni's family was in a more difficult situation.

Ali's father, Karim, was lent gardening equipment and a bicycle. On the weekend, he goes around wealthier areas in Semarang with Ali in search for a gardening job. He eventually gets hired by a grandfather who has a grandchild, and were paid generously. After discussing what to buy from their first salary, the bicycle's brakes fail, leaving both injured and the bicycle broken. Roy and his men come over to their house and tries to forcefully evict the family. Unexpectedly, Karim's colleague at the mosque offered to pay his debts and offers to fix Karim's bicycle.

Ali learns of a children's marathon race celebrating the city's anniversary, with the prize for finishing third being a pair of sneakers. Ali enters to win new shoes and promises Zahra that he will win third place. However, he accidentally finished first. In the meantime, Karim, after another hard day of work, buys two pairs of shoes for both Ali and Zahra.

== Cast ==
- Jared Ali as Ali
- Humaira Jahra as Zahra
- Andri Mashadi as Karim, Ali and Zahra's father
- Faradina Mufti as Fatimah, Ali and Zahra's mother
- Muhadkly Acho as Slamet, Ali's principal
- Oki Rengga as Bowo, Ali's gym teacher
- Dodit Mulyanto as Suraji, Ali's homeroom teacher
- Sheera Melodia as Yeni (equivalent to Roya in the original film)
- Varen Arianda Calief as Bara (equivalent to Alireza in the original film)
- Slamet Rahardjo as Mulyadi, Bara's grandfather
- Lolox as Roy
