= Saudade (TV series) =

2025 Indonesian teen television series

- Genre: Teen; Drama
- Based on: Saudade by Asri Aci
- Story by: Dono Indarto
- Directed by: Andri Sofyansyah
- Starring: Callista Arum; Abun Sungkar; Lorenzo Gibbs; Bianca Hello; Dimas Putra; Isad Gaddafi; Adil Ibra; Febriant Teja; Vonny Felicia; Adel Reva; Zora Vidyanata; Joseph Kara; Wina Marrino; Dono Indarto; Vidya Ully
- Country of origin: Indonesia
- Original language: Indonesian
- No. of seasons: 1
- No. of episodes: 12

Production
- Executive producer: Yaya Said
- Producers: Ferry Lesmana; Eri Kuswanda; Taufik Kusnandar
- Editors: Nanang Rizky; Iwan Ronny
- Camera setup: Multi-camera
- Running time: 30 minutes
- Production company: Permata Pictures

Original release
- Network: Viu
- Release: 4 March – 9 April 2025

Saudade is an Indonesian teen television series that premiered on 4 March 2025 on Viu. Produced by Permata Pictures, it starred Callista Arum, Abun Sungkar and Lorenzo Gibbs. This series based on Asri Aci's novel Saudade.

== Plot ==
A high school girl named Kashi who experiences heartbreak after her boyfriend Daffa suddenly ends their relationship.

The reason Daffa breaks up is because he wants to get closer to Rasty who is Kashi's best friend. Kashi's heartache becomes deeper because of the betrayal of the two people she trusts the most.

Kashi tries to get up to heal her heartache. She then meets Akash, an annoying rebellious student. Akash's presence makes Kashi's heartache slowly subside.

Initially, Kashi and Akash's meetings always end in fights and arguments. Those who never thought of falling in love, slowly help each other to find their true selves.

== Cast ==
- Callista Arum as Kashi Rayshiva
- Abun Sungkar as Akash Angkasa
- Lorenzo Gibbs as Daffa
- Bianca Hello as Rasty
- Dimas Putra as Fabian
- Isad Gaddafi as Dennis
- Adil Ibra as Lintang
- Febriant Teja as Zahir
- Vonny Felicia as Mawar
- Adel Reva as Keira
- Zora Vidyanata as Mama Akash
- Joseph Kara as Papa Akash
- Wina Marrino as Mama Kashi
- Dono Indarto as Papa Kashi
- Vidya Ully as Mama Rasty
- Santana as Papa Rasty
- Hayu Pangastuti as Mbok Syarmi

== Production ==
=== Casting ===
Callista Arum was selected to portray the lead role of Kashi. Bianca Hello was cast as Rasty.

== Soundtrack ==
This soundtrack is sung by Zara Leola, "Hilang Tapi Ada".
