= Aku Tak Membenci Hujan =

2024 Indonesian teen television series

- Genre: Teen; Romance
- Created by: Oswin Bonifanz
- Based on: Aku Tak Membenci Hujan by Sri Puji Hartini
- Screenplay by: Fiona Mahdalena
- Story by: Fiona Mahdalena
- Directed by: Adhe Dharmastriya
- Starring: Aisyah Aqilah; Jeff Smith; Vonny Felicia; Yessica Tamara; Ryan Winter; Farell Akbar; Abun Hadi; Duway; Lorenzo Gibbs; Femila Sinukaban; Gabriel Prince; Mona Ratuliu; Lorenzo Gibbs
- Opening theme: "Belum Siap Kehilangan" — Stevan Pasaribu
- Ending theme: "Belum Siap Kehilangan" — Stevan Pasaribu
- Composer: Nick Hariprawiro
- Country of origin: Indonesia
- Original language: Indonesian
- No. of seasons: 1
- No. of episodes: 8

Production
- Executive producers: Ajivit Dutta; Toha Essa
- Producer: Oswin Bonifanz
- Editors: Dk Senja; R.M Widihasmoro
- Camera setup: Multi-camera
- Running time: 45 minutes
- Production company: Unlimited Production

Original release
- Network: Viu
- Release: 9 December 2024 – 3 January 2025

Aku Tak Membenci Hujan is an Indonesian television series produced by Unlimited Production which premiered on 9 December 2024 on Viu, based on the Wattpad story of the same title by Sri Puji Hartini. It stars Aisyah Aqilah, Jeff Smith, and Vonny Felicia. The series tells an emotional journey full of family secrets, split personalities, and self-discovery, wrapped in a story of love and determination.

== Plot ==
Launa, a beautiful and cheerful girl, who falls in love with Karang who turns out to have a split personality. However, the poor man wants to kill the Karang figure in him. Karang prefers to be Banu, a small child or Agha, a disobedient and rebellious teenager. Launa tries to get Karang to return to his true self.

However, the man's heart is too hurt to be Karang who is full of trauma, born from mistakes, hated for no reason, and considered worthless by his mother, making Karang Samudra Daneswara live in sorrow. Will Launa get the love of Karang who has never wanted anything in her life except a hug from Andira, her biological mother?

== Cast ==
- Jeff Smith as Karang Samudra Daneswara
- Aisyah Aqilah as Launa Felicia Damaris
- Vonny Felicia as Thalia Anastasya
- Yessica Tamara as Gladys
- Ryan Winter as Orion Sagara
- Lorenzo Gibbs as Lukka Shah Kara
- Femila Sinukaban as Rain Oktara
- Gabriel Prince as Ghenta Arsha Nendra
- Santana as Pramana Daneswara
- Mona Ratuliu as Andira Deepa
- Farell Akbar as Laut Biru Daneswara
- Abun Hadi as Pradikta Daneswara
- Merry Mustaf as Sita Prasmoyo
- Duway as Fabian Damaris
- Chacha Marisa as Miranti Syerlo
- Sakha Sadysa as Caca
- Arly Aulia Sinaga as Fiona
- Yesaya Mishael as Teman Genta 1
- Nich Bremerich as Teman Genta 2
- Elvito as Dr. Calista
- Patrick Cuncic as Karang Samudra Daneswara kecil
- Dash Cetinich as Karang Samudra Daneswara remaja
- Jabez Imanuel as Laut Biru Daneswara kecil
- Oliver Soegandah as Teman Sekolah 1
- Ashley Soegandah as Teman Sekolah 2

== Production ==
=== Casting ===
Jeff Smith was chosen to play Karang. Mona Ratuliu was roped in to play Andira Deepa. Yessica Tamara was cast as Gladys.
