= Dinda Kirana =

Indonesian actress and singer

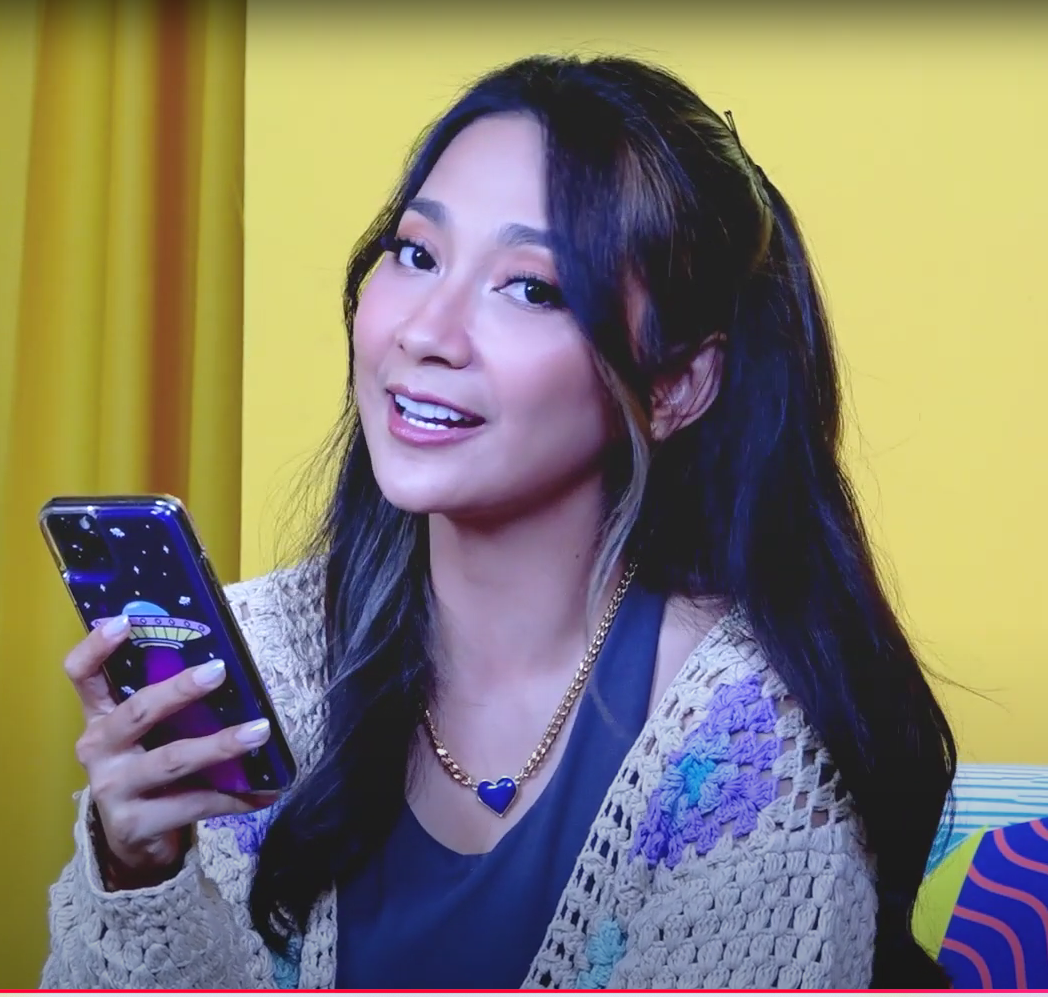
- Dinda in 2022
- Born: Dinda Kirana Sukmawati; April 30, 1995 (age 30); Tasikmalaya, West Java, Indonesia
- Occupations: Actress; singer; presenter; model
- Years active: 2004—present
- Awards: see list
- Musical career
- Instrument: Vocal

Dinda Kirana Sukmawati (born 30 April 1995) is an Indonesian actress and singer.

== Early life ==
Dinda was born with the name Dinda Kirana Sukmawati on April 30, 1995 in Tasikmalaya, Indonesia. She is the second of three children of Sumardi and Lia Priatiningsih.

== Career ==
Dinda started her career through the soap opera Si Cecep as an extra. Her role in the soap opera continued when she acted in the soap opera Inikah Rasa. Then Dinda successfully entered as a contestant on the 2004 Cipta Bintang Television talent search show. After being quite successful in the acting world, Dinda tried to spread her wings to the world of singing. She had released mini album with 3 singles namely "Saranghae", "Hari yang Cerah", and "Malu Mengaku Cinta" which became the theme song for television film Tikus Kucing Mencari Cinta Lagi.

== Filmography ==
=== Film ===
Acting roles
| Year | Title | Role | Notes |
|---|---|---|---|
| 2021 | Persahabatan Bagai Kepompong | Beby | |
| 2021 | Seamin Tak Seiman | Danisa | Short film |
