= Vidio =

Indonesian video streaming service

- Company type: Subsidiary
- Website type: OTT platform
- Available in: 2 languages
- List of languages: Indonesian; English
- Headquarters: Jakarta, {{{location_country}}}
- Country of origin: Indonesia
- Area served: Indonesia; Worldwide (selected contents)
- Owner: see list
- Founder: Adi Sariaatmadja
- Key people: Sutanto Hartono; Monika Rudijono
- Services: Video on demand
- Parent: Elang Mahkota Teknologi
- Website: www.vidio.com
- Commercial: Yes
- Registration: Optional
- Launched: October 15, 2014; 11 years ago
- Current status: Active

PT Vidio Dot Com (Vidio) is an Indonesian over-the-top subscription video on-demand streaming television service that was launched on October 15, 2014. Its offerings include free-to-air and paid live broadcast, films and series, as well as Vidio original programs. Initially owned by Kreatif Media Online, Vidio was acquired by Surya Citra Media, a subsidiary of Emtek. In 2022, Vidio was recognized as the largest video-on-demand service provider in Indonesia, surpassing Netflix, Disney+ Hotstar, and Amazon Prime Video.

== History ==
Founded as the Indonesian counterpart of YouTube, Vidio originally consisted mostly of user-generated content and TV content from Emtek's media outlets. In 2015, Vidio had about 3,000 to 4,000 monthly active users.

Emtek's total investment in Vidio as of March 2019 reached IDR 240 billion. Surya Citra Media planned to take over Vidio at a price of IDR 115 billion. After producing 3 original series in 2019, Vidio began to release more original series on Vidio Premier, their premium subscription service, dubbed as "Vidio Originals" in 2020. In the same year, Vidio had 40 million active users.

During the COVID-19 pandemic, the platform saw 225% growth and recorded more than 5 million downloads in App Store and Play Store.

On 7 November 2021, MNC noticed the removal of all its television channels to Vidio under alleged an carriage dispute when MNC Vision Networks owned Vision+ for RCTI, MNCTV, GTV and iNews.

Vidio is exclusive digital broadcaster of Premier League from 2022–2023 to 2027–2028 season. Most of the big matches were streamed exclusively on the platform with its sister network SCTV and Moji aired the remainders.

After Fox Sports Asia ceased operation in October 2021, Emtek acquired the rights to broadcast Formula One for the remainder of 2021 and 2022 season. The races were broadcast in Champions TV 4 (which was included in Vidio's premium subscription) and FTA terrestrial channel Moji.

Vidio officially held its rights for 2022 FIFA World Cup broadcaster in Qatar, 2023 FIFA U-20 World Cup in Argentina, 2023 FIFA U-17 World Cup in Indonesia and upcoming 2024 FIFA U-20 Women's World Cup would be broadcast.

In May 2025, Vidio introduced the "Vidio Mini Drama" format—short-form mini-dramas spanning just 1–2 minutes per episode, designed to deliver emotionally resonant storytelling with rapid pacing and surprise endings. As of mid-May, the series had accumulated over 8 million views.

In August 2025, Vidio unveiled a new corporate tagline, "Lebih Dari Hiburan" ("More than Entertainment"), to reflect its aim to become not only a streaming platform but also a space for growth and expression for audiences and local creators.

Vidio also launched the "Kompetisi Film Vidio", a short-film competition running from August 14, 2025, to April 30, 2026, designed to support young Indonesian filmmakers through idea development, pitching, mentoring, production funding, and festival exposure.

== Ownership ==
The following is a list of company ownership based on Surya Citra Media's financial statements as of September 30, 2024.

| Shareholder name | Percentage of ownership (%) |
|---|---|
| PT Surya Citra Media Tbk | 79.37% |
| Other | 20.63% |
