= Ardila (surname) =

Ardila is a Spanish surname that is primarily found in Colombia. Notable people with the surname include:

- Alfredo Ardila (1946–2021), Colombian neuropsychologist
- Andrés Ardila (born 1999), Colombian cyclist
- Carlos Ardila Lülle (1930–2021), Colombian entrepreneur
- Federico Ardila (born 1977), Colombian mathematician and DJ
- Jaime Ardila Casamitjana (1919–2019), Colombian writer
- Jorge Ardila Serrano (1927–2010), Colombian Roman Catholic bishop
- José Ardila (born 1985), Colombian writer
- Juan Ardila, American politician
- María Cristina Ardila-Robayo (1947–2017), Colombian herpetologist
- Mauricio Ardila (born 1979), Colombian road bicycle racer
- Rubén Ardila (1942–2025), Colombian psychologist

== See also ==
- Evaristo Porras Ardila (died 2010), Colombian drug trafficker
- Nike Ardilla (1975–1995), Indonesian singer and actress
