= Ardilla =

Ardilla may refer to:

- Ardilla, Alabama, an unincorporated community
- Nike Ardilla (1975–1995), Indonesian singer and actress
  - Nike Ardilla the Series, an Indonesian TV series

== See also ==
- Ardila, a river of Spain and Portugal
- Ardila (surname)
