= Duren Jatuh =

2025 Indonesian television series

- Genre: Romantic comedy
- Created by: Vemmy Sagita
- Screenplay by: Vemmy Sagita; Michelle Putri
- Directed by: Vemmy Sagita
- Starring: Zoe Abbas Jackson; Nino Fernandez; Mario Lawalata; Samuel Rizal; Marcell Darwin; Arya Mohan; Harry Vaughan; Michella Putri; Dominique Sanda; Meriam Bellina; Pierre Gruno; Dian Sidik; Rifat Darwis; Flavio Zaviera; Luz Victoria; Lenny Marlina; Nova Soraya; Mischa Chandrawinata; Enditha; Kaemita Boediono
- Opening theme: "Hero" by Noah
- Ending theme: "Hero" by Noah
- Country of origin: Indonesia
- Original language: Indonesian
- No. of seasons: 1
- No. of episodes: 8

Production
- Executive producers: David S. Suwarto; Jeff Han; Juan Xiang; Febriamy Hutapea
- Producer: Vemmy Sagita
- Cinematography: Deni Irawan
- Editor: Bambang Herdiana
- Camera setup: Multi-camera
- Running time: 40 minutes
- Production company: SinemArt

Original release
- Network: WeTV
- Release: 11 April – 31 May 2025

Duren Jatuh is an Indonesian television series that premiered on 11 April 2025 on WeTV. Produced by SinemArt and starred Zoe Abbas Jackson, Nino Fernandez, and Mario Lawalata.

== Plot ==
Anne (Zoe Abbas Jackson) is 22 years old and has grown up with her father in a masculine environment since she was little.

Her father often invited her to hang out with his motorcycle gang. It is no wonder that Anne easily became close to her male friends.

She fell in love at first sight in high school with a man named Julian (Nino Fernandez) who had just moved from Jakarta.

Julian is one of Anne's father's friends. Although considered like her own uncle, it turns out that Anne is captivated by Julian.

But it turns out that her love is unrequited. Long story short, Julian and Anne separated. After many years, Anne was then reunited with Julian.

When she met Julian, Anne still had her old feelings but Julian was already a widower. Julian felt uncomfortable with the situation that his friend's son fell in love with him. Julian decided to leave Anne.

== Cast ==
- Zoe Abbas Jackson as Anne
- Nino Fernandez as Julian
- Mario Lawalata as Liam
- Samuel Rizal as Felix
- Marcell Darwin as Nolan
- Arya Mohan as Ethan
- Harry Vaughan as Lucas
- Aylena Fusil as Dea
- Michella Putri as Nicole Jersey
- Dominique Sanda as Laura
- Meriam Bellina as Nenek Warung
- Pierre Gruno as Mucikari
- Dian Sidik as Pemilik Warung
- Rifat Darwis as Mumu
- Alejandro Mariano as Doni
- Flavio Zaviera as Flavio: Anne's friend
- Luz Victoria as Luz: Anne's friend
- Audy Maulidyna as Audy: Anne's friend
- Shakira Najwa as Shakira: Anne's friend
- Lenny Marlina as Oma Anne
- Nova Soraya as Maria
- Mischa Chandrawinata as Juan
- Ena Pasaribu as Ena
- Enditha as Isabella
- Kaemita Boediono as Kaemita: Laura's friend

== Production ==
=== Development ===
In September 2024, WeTV announced a new series titled Duren Jatuh.

=== Casting ===
Zoe Abbas Jackson was chosen to play the female lead, Anne. Mischa Chandrawinata was first approached to play the male lead of Julian. However, he was sick with typhoid and had to lose 11 kilograms for the role of Julian, and was replaced by Nino Fernandez. For the role of Julian, Fernandez lost 6 kilograms for the fit role. Michella Putri was cast as Nicole Jersey.

=== Release ===
The series was scheduled to be released on 3 April 2025, and the series was released on 11 April 2025.
