= Nike Ardilla the Series =

Indonesian television series

- Genre: Drama; Romance; Musical
- Created by: Harris Nizam
- Written by: Beby Hasibuan
- Directed by: Harris Nizam
- Starring: Zoe Abbas Jackson; Endhita; Indra Brasco; Surya Saputra; Debo Andryos; Kiesha Alvaro; Zikri Daulay; Marcellino Lefrandt; Luthfi Aulia; Eddi Brokoli; Zidni Hakim; Mentari Novel; Ariyo Wahab; Nayla D. Purnama
- Theme music composer: Deddy Dores
- Opening theme: "Bintang Kehidupan" by Nike Ardilla
- Ending theme: "Bintang Kehidupan" by Nike Ardilla
- Country of origin: Indonesia
- Original language: Indonesian
- No. of seasons: 2
- No. of episodes: 6

Production
- Producer: Harris Nizam
- Cinematography: Aryo Chikofio
- Camera setup: Multi-camera
- Running time: 45 minutes
- Production company: Aletta Pictures

Original release
- Release: 27 October 2023 – 25 October 2024

Nike Ardilla the Series is an Indonesian biographical musical television series produced by Aletta Pictures which aired from 27 October 2023 to 25 October 2024 on Stro. It stars Zoe Abbas Jackson, Endhita, and Indra Brasco.

== Series overview ==
Season	Episodes	Originally released	
Season	Episodes	First released	Last released
1	3	27 October 2023	24 November 2023
2	3	20 September 2024	25 October 2024

== Plot ==
Having dreamed of becoming a singer since childhood, Nike Ardilla began to show her singing talent and interest in the arts. Despite numerous obstacles, Nike faced persistent efforts to develop her talent, and thanks to her family's efforts and support, her dream finally came true.

== Cast ==
- Zoe Abbas Jackson as Nike Ardilla
- Endhita as Nining Ningsihrat
- Indra Brasco / Surya Saputra as Raden Eddy Kusnadi
- Debo Andryos as Raden Alan Yudi
- Kiesha Alvaro as Raden Deden Soni
- Brenda Ehan as Umar
- Luthfi Aulia as Iwan
- Eddi Brokoli as Denny Sabri
- Ridzky Surya as Hery Arnaz
- Kanzia Zhaviera Queennov as Nike Ardilla
- Cha Cha Marisa as Tetty Kaddi
- Marcellino Lefrandt as redaktur majalah Musikkuz
- Zidni Hakim as Adjie Esa Poetra
- Mentari Novel as Gita Ganesha
- Ariyo Wahab as Deddy Dores
- Nayla D. Purnama as Fitri
- Zikri Daulay as Andra Fahreza
- Fathesya Queena Milaila as Ratih
- Adinda Vyrli Yudhistira as Melly
- Zhafirah as Inka
- Evi Oktavia as ibu Ratih
- Adam as Judhi Kristianto
- Aurel Tarigan as Poppy
- Aqila Zhufairah as Sinta
- Jeffry Reska / Vasamalik Vann as Dewan
- Ray Surajaya as Shendy
- Richard Gibson as Deni Beeup
- Suci Siregar as Atun
- Aycell Ghrzella as Dessy
- Berlian Aura as Sari
- Lazuardy Nasution as Ryan Hidayat
- Maya Mudie as ibu Shendy
- Sutan Rambun Pamenan as Siswa pria
- Hazman Al-Idrus as Azni
- Jemimah Cita as Merry
- Anastasia Nawa as Sheila
- Jason Barnett as Robert
- Key B as Melly
- Aldo Irawan as Poltak Pangabean
- Bulan Nizam as Maharani Djodi
- Anisa as Mayangsari
- Kamila as Poppy Mercury
- Azalea as Ita Purnamasari
- Hanof as Cut Irna
- Irfan as Kaka Slank
- Fathi as Dedi Dhukun

== Production ==
=== Development ===
Before starting the filming process, Harris Nizam as Director conducted research and involved fans in the process of selecting the cast for the role of Nike Ardilla. For the role of Nike Ardilla, Jackson studied Sundanese. After being chosen to play Nike Ardilla, Jackson discussed it with her family.

=== Casting ===
Zoe Abbas Jackson was confirmed to play Nike Ardilla. Jackson also refused the role of Nike Ardilla because her objected. Eddi Brokoli also was cast as Denny Sabri.
