= Mikha Tambayong =

Indonesian actress (born 1994)

- Born: 15 September 1994 (age 31); Jakarta, Indonesia
- Genres: Pop, RnB, dance, pop rock, jazz, soul
- Occupations: Singer, dancer, celebrity, model, musician
- Years active: 2008–present
- Labels: Sony Music, Epic, Columbia, MyMusic Records
- Spouse: Deva Mahenra (m. 2023)

Maudy Mikha Maria Tambayong (born 15 September 1994) is an Indonesian singer, dancer, actress, model, and musician.

== Filmography ==
=== Film ===
| Year | Film | Role | Notes |
|---|---|---|---|
| 2012 | Fallin' in Love | Larasati | |
| 2012 | Senandung Bumi | Naya | |
| 2013 | Slank Nggak Ada Matinya | Ony | |
| 2015 | Check in Bangkok | Renata | |
| 2016 | Promise | Moza | |
| 2023 | Sewu Dino | Sri Rahayu | |
| 2025 | The Elixir | Kenes | |

=== Soap opera ===
| Year | soap opera title | Role | TV channel | Production |
|---|---|---|---|---|
| 2008 | Kepompong | Tasya | SCTV | Frame Ritz Productions |
| 2010 | Kapten Kompleks | Sinar | SCTV | Frame Ritz Productions |
| 2011 | Nada Cinta | Nada Cinta | Indosiar | MD Entertainment |
| 2011 | Aishiteru | Tasya | MNCTV | MD Entertainment |
| 2013 | Kinara | Kinara | Global TV | MD Entertainment |
| 2014 | Siti Blink-Blink | Siti Blink-Blink | RCTI | |

== Discography ==
| Year | Album | Language | Production |
|---|---|---|---|
| 2010 | Bekas Pacar | Indonesian | Sony Music Indonesia, Epic Records, Columbia Records |
| 2011 | Nada Cinta | Indonesian | MD Music |
| 2011 | Aishiteru | Indonesian | MD Music |
| 2012 | Fallin' in Love | Indonesian | Sony Music Indonesia, Epic Records, Columbia Records |
| 2012 | Senandung Bumi | Indonesian | Sony Music Indonesia, Epic Records, Columbia Records |
| 2013 | Kinara | Indonesian | MD Music |

== Advertisement ==
- Pucelle (with Cinta Laura)
- Kino Snack It Cookies
- Dewan Nasional Perubahan Iklim (film by Senandung Bumi)
- Marina UV White
- Cadbury ad
- Laurier Double Comfort
