= The Elixir =

2025 zombie film by Kimo Stamboel

- Promotional poster
- Indonesian: Abadi Nan Jaya
- Directed by: Kimo Stamboel
- Written by: Kimo Stamboel; Agasyah Karim; Khalid Kashogi
- Produced by: Kimo Stamboel; Edwin Nazir
- Starring: Mikha Tambayong; Eva Celia; Donny Damara; Marthino Lio
- Cinematography: Patrick Tashadian
- Edited by: Fachrun Daud
- Music by: Fajar Yuskemal
- Production company: Mowin Pictures
- Distributed by: Netflix
- Release date: 23 October 2025
- Country: Indonesia
- Languages: Indonesian; Javanese

The Elixir (Indonesian: Abadi Nan Jaya; lit. 'Everlasting and Glorious') is a 2025 Indonesian zombie film directed, produced, and co-written by Kimo Stamboel. The film stars Mikha Tambayong, Eva Celia, Donny Damara, and Marthino Lio. It was released by Netflix on 23 October 2025.

== Plot ==
The story opens at a local celebration where Ningsih works as kitchen help. Her boyfriend Rahman arrives, and she confronts him over promising to marry her before backing out. He considers proposing while washing dishes with her, but is called back to the police station by his boss. He promises to put her first and she forgives him, although he still does not propose. After he leaves, a minivan crashes into the reception. The local chief confronts its driver but is attacked and killed when his throat is torn out. The narrative then returns to five hours earlier, when samples of a liquid called ANJ are packaged and sent to two households.

Kenes, her husband Rudi, and their son Raihan visit Kenes' estranged father Sadimin and brother Bambang in Wanirejo to discuss selling their family's jamu business, Wani Waras. Kenes resents Sadimin for marrying her best friend, Karina. Sadimin drinks a prototype jamu and is transformed into a younger man. He announces that he will not sell Wani Waras, but instead expand it by marketing the jamu as Abadi Nan Jaya. After the family argues, Sadimin suffers a seizure and collapses, then reanimates and attacks servants Aris and Pardi. Pardi is bitten, while Aris is splashed with Sadimin's blood but remains unharmed. Sadimin attacks Bambang, who accidentally impales him with a crossbow bolt. Rudi sends Aris for help, but Aris reanimates while driving and crashes into the village chief's celebration, attacking the attendees and beginning an outbreak.

At Sadimin's residence, Pardi also reanimates and infects the household staff. Kenes and Bambang escape in her car, becoming separated from Rudi, Raihan, Karina, and maid Mbok Sum. Rudi's group seeks shelter at the village chief's house, only to find it overrun by zombies. They barricade themselves inside, but Kenes inadvertently attracts the undead by honking her car and flees with Bambang to the police station. Rudi's group escapes to another house, where Mbok attacks them after reanimating. Rudi kills her with a meat cleaver but is bitten. He says goodbye to Raihan and Karina before reanimating and attacking them. They impale him on a metal pump lever, and the house's owner locks him in a room.

Kenes and Bambang reach the station and warn the officers. The commander sends men to investigate, but they are killed by the zombies. After becoming infected, the commander orders Rahman to barricade the station before reanimating; Bambang locks him in a cell. Ningsih calls Rahman to say that she is trapped with Raihan and Karina. Karina tells Kenes about Rudi's infection, allowing the women to reconcile. Rahman and the others arm themselves from the station's armoury and attempt to summon reinforcements, but other police units have also been overrun. Rahman and Bambang discover that the zombies are attracted to sound when a horde attacks a mosque after hearing the adhan.

At night, Kenes, Rahman, and Bambang use confiscated firecrackers to divert the zombies. Stragglers delay them until a rainstorm immobilises the undead. Kenes hides in a lorry, while Rahman and Bambang return to the station. Ningsih's group uses her motorcycle to reach them, finding Kenes surrounded by zombies. Kenes fires a flare to lure the horde towards a rice field, allowing the others to reach the lorry. Karina then crashes the lorry into the station when its brakes fail, pinning Bambang and allowing zombies inside. Ningsih is bitten while avoiding the undead and the imprisoned commander, whom Rahman shoots. Rahman is subsequently bitten while defending her. As they are devoured, Rahman finally proposes and Ningsih accepts.

After shooting the reanimated Rudi, Raihan, Karina, and Kenes try to free Bambang, but he orders them to leave. He throws a firecracker onto leaking petrol, detonating the remaining explosives and destroying the station and most of the zombies. Kenes reveals that she has been bitten and entrusts Raihan to Karina. She uses flares to lure away the remaining zombies before shooting herself. Karina and Raihan escape on a motorcycle as the undead pursue them.

In a mid-credits scene, Sadimin's business partners in Jakarta, Santoso and Grace, unsuccessfully attempt to contact him and his family. Grace drinks a vial of Abadi Nan Jaya, becomes younger, and shows the result to Santoso.

== Cast ==
- Mikha Tambayong as Kenes: Sadimin's daughter, Bambang's sister, Rudi's wife, Raihan's mother, Karina's bestfriend-turned-stepdaughter
- Eva Celia as Karina: Sadimin's wife, Kenes and Bambang's stepmother, Raihan's step-grandmother
- Donny Damara as Sadimin: Owner of Wani Waras Jamu Company, Kenes and Bambang's father, Karina's husband, Rudi's father-in-law, Raihan's grandfather
- Marthino Lio as Bambang: Sadimin's son, Kenes's brother, Raihan's uncle, Rudi's brother-in-law, Karina's stepson
- Dimas Anggara as Rudi: Kenes's husband, Raihan's father, Sadimin's son-in-law, Bambang's brother-in-law
- Varen Alianda Calief as Raihan: Kenes and Rudi's son, Sadimin's grandson, Bambang's nephew, Karina's step-grandson
- Ardit Erwandha as Rahman: A police officer, Ningsih's boyfriend
- Claresta Taufan as Ningsih: A local resident, Rahman's girlfriend
- Vonny Anggraini as Mbok Sum: The maid of Sadimin's family
- Kiki Narendra as Aris: Sadimin's driver
- Karina Suwandi as Grace: Sadimin's business partner, Santoso's wife
- Willem Bevers as Santoso: Grace's husband
- Moh. Iqbal Sulaiman as Truck Driver

== Production ==
In June 2024, Netflix announced the project as part of its Southeast Asian slate, alongside another zombie film, Carlo Ledesma's Outside from the Philippines. The film was later reported to be released in 2025.

Principal photography took place around Bantul, Yogyakarta, and Magelang, Central Java.

== Release ==
The Elixir was released on 23 October 2025 on Netflix.

== Reception ==
In just seven days after its release, The Elixir charted in Netflix's Global Top 10 of non-English film with more than 11 million audiences, and also ranked the Top 10 Films in 75 countries, including Japan, South Korea, the Philippines, Malaysia, Germany, France, South Africa, Canada and Brazil. It is also claimed for the top spot in five countries: Indonesia, Dominican Republic, Peru, Ecuador, and Turkey.
