= Claresta Taufan =

Indonesian actress (born 1996)

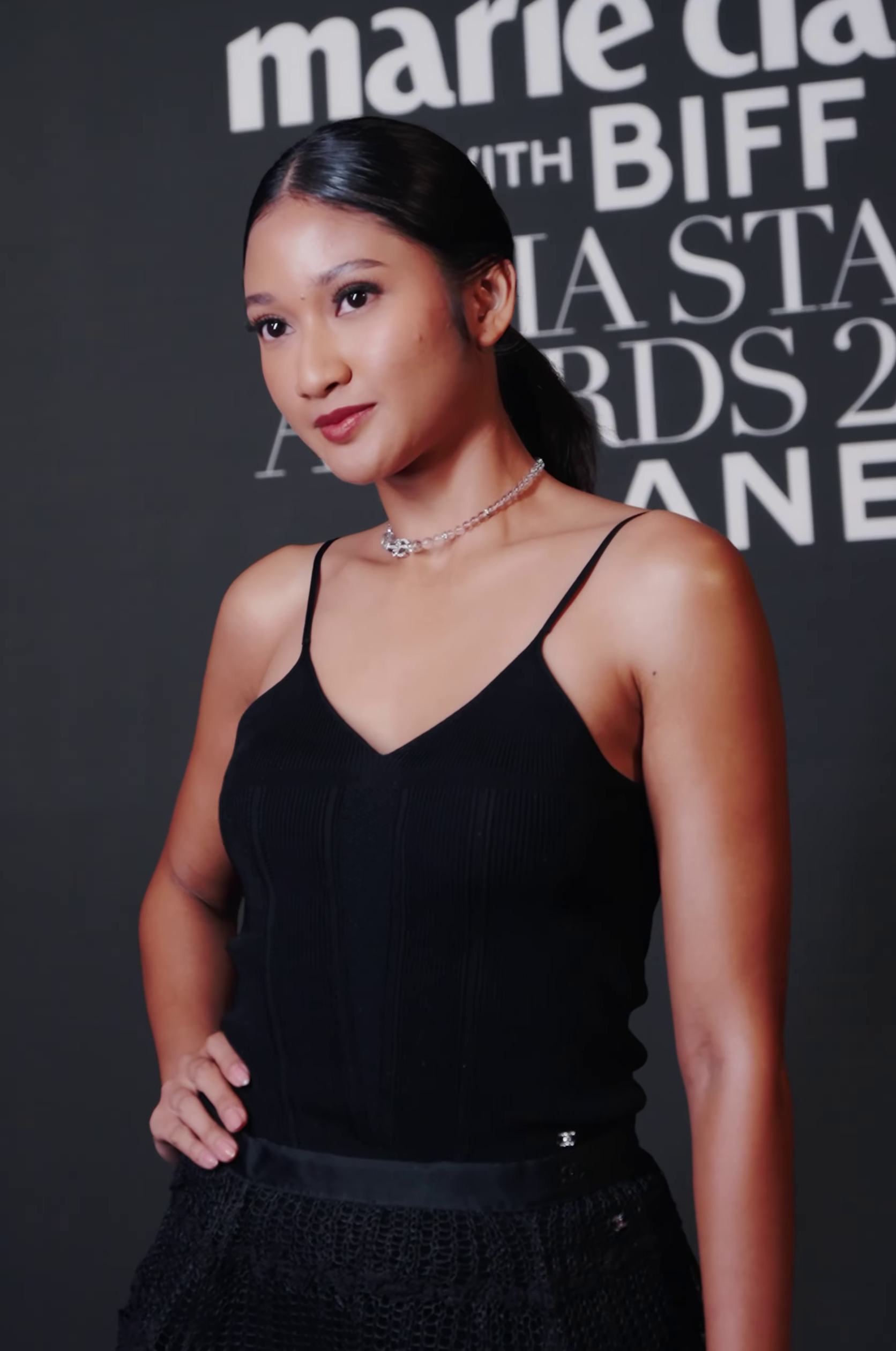
- Taufan in 2025
- Born: Raden Rara Claresta Taufan Kusumarina; 23 April 1996 (age 30); Jakarta, Indonesia
- Occupations: Actress; television presenter; karateka
- Years active: 2017–present

Raden Rara Claresta Taufan Kusumarina (born 23 April 1996) is an Indonesian actress, television presenter, and former karateka. She rose to prominence for starring in the supernatural horror film Dancing Village: The Curse Begins (2024) and the leading role in the drama film On Your Lap (2025). For the latter, she received a Citra Award nomination for Best Actress. She also received the Rising Star Award at the Marie Claire Asia Star Awards 2025.

== Early life ==
Raden Rara Claresta Taufan Kusumarina was born on 23 April 1996 in Jakarta, Indonesia. Her interest in karate was influenced by her father, who is a karateka. She began practicing the sport in the third grade. She currently holds a black belt in karate and has achieved the third level. She graduated from BINUS University, majoring in architecture.

== Career ==
In 2012, Taufan joined the Indonesian junior team to compete in the Asian Karate Championships, held in Tashkent, Uzbekistan. In 2013, she earned the silver medal at the Olimpiade Olahraga Siswa Nasional (English: National Student Sports Olympics), representing Banten. In 2018, she began her television career as a presenter for NET. Sports on NET. She also served as a host for travel documentary series Jejak Petualang on Trans7 in 2019.

She made her acting debut in 2020, portraying Kayla in the romance horror web series Titisan: Thalia Pewaris Tahta Iblis. In 2024, she starred in her first film role in the horror film Ronggeng Kematian. For the role, she underwent training to learn the traditional ronggeng dance. In the same year, she starred in supernatural horror film Dancing Village: The Curse Begins, sequel of box-office hit KKN di Desa Penari.

In 2025, she starred in the leading role of Reza Rahadian's directorial debut film On Your Lap. The film had its world premiere at the 30th Busan International Film Festival. For her performance, she received the Rising Star Award at the Marie Claire Asia Star Awards 2025, alongside South Korean actors Shin Ye-eun and Rowoon. She also received a Citra Award nomination for Best Actress at the 2025 Indonesian Film Festival. She also starred in Kimo Stamboel's zombie film The Elixir in the same year.

== Filmography ==
=== Film ===
Year	Title	Role	Notes
2024	Ronggeng Kematian	Larasati	
2024	Dancing Village: The Curse Begins	Ratih	
2024	Sakaratul Maut	Indah	
2025	Surga di Telapak Kaki Bapak	Dinar	
2025	The Cursed of Satan Temptation	Ratna	
2025	Maryam: Janji dan Jiwa yang Terikat	Maryam	
2025	The Period of Her	Wati	Segment: "Romansa Keparat"
2025	On Your Lap	Sartika	
2025	The Elixir	Ningsih	

=== Television ===
Year	Title	Role	Network	Notes
2018–2019	NET. Sports	Herself/Presenter	NET.	
2019–2020	Jejak Petualang	Herself/Presenter	Trans7	
2020	Titisan: Thalia Pewaris Tahta Iblis	Kayla	WeTV	
2021	Buku Harian Seorang Istri	Dewi	SCTV	
2022	Serigala Terakhir	Rinta	Vidio	Season 2
