= Rubén Ardila =

Colombian psychologist

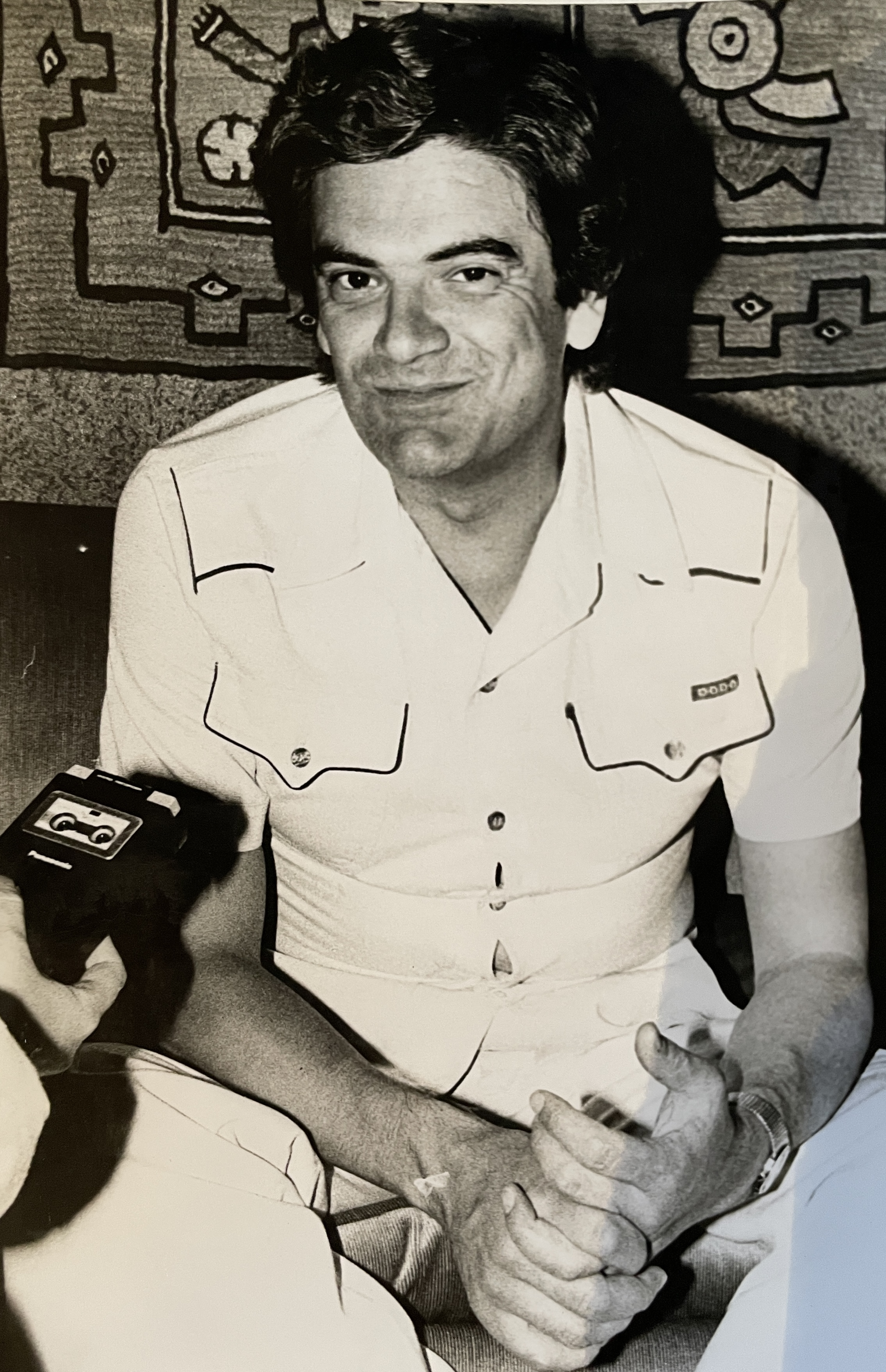
- Ruben Ardila, c.1978
- Born: July 7, 1942; San Vicente de Chucurí, Santander, Colombia
- Died: January 14, 2025 (aged 82); Bogotá, Colombia
- Education: National University of Colombia; University of Nebraska–Lincoln
- Known for: Founder of the Latin American Journal of Psychology; Formulation of the Experimental Synthesis of Behavior
- Scientific career
- Fields: Experimental psychology History of psychology Social psychology

Rubén Ardila Ardila (7 July 1942 – 14 January 2025) was a Colombian psychologist.. He earned his degree in psychology from the National University of Colombia (1964) and later a Ph.D. in Experimental Psychology from the University of Nebraska–Lincoln (1969). Ardila worked in several fields within psychology, including experimental psychology, history of psychology, and social issues. He played a central role in promoting scientific psychology in Latin America and in strengthening international academic collaboration.

He taught at the National University of Colombia, the University of the Andes (Colombia), and the Santo Tomás University (Colombia), and served as visiting professor in Germany, Argentina, Ecuador, Spain, the United States, Brazil, Puerto Rico, and Peru.

== Personal life ==
=== Family ===
Ardila grew up in Pereira, Risaralda. His father, Benjamín Ardila, was an independent businessman, and his mother, Roselia Ardila, a homemaker. He was the eldest of five siblings, including endocrinologist Enrique Ardila, neuropsychologist Alfredo Ardila, linguist Olga Ardila, and international policy specialist Martha Ardila.

He was married to Ana Lucía González, an anthropologist, and had one son, David Rubén, a NASA researcher, and one grandson, Alejandro.

=== Education ===
Ardila began his studies at the National University of Colombia in 1960 at age 17. From the outset, he questioned the psychoanalytic dominance of the Psychology Department, favoring a more empirical and scientific approach. His undergraduate thesis, La profesión del psicólogo (The Profession of Psychology, 1964), explored the identity and professional boundaries of psychologists in Colombia.

He obtained his master’s and Ph.D. degrees at the University of Nebraska–Lincoln, where he studied under James Reynierse and William J. Arnold. His doctoral dissertation was titled A Parametric Investigation of Transposition.

=== Beliefs and influences ===
Influenced by his analytical father and humanistic mother, Ardila developed a scientific and non-theistic worldview. In adolescence he distanced himself from the Catholic Church, believing that science provided more consistent explanations for human existence. His intellectual influences included Charles Darwin, Santiago Ramón y Cajal, Bertrand Russell, B. F. Skinner, and Stefan Zweig.

== Academic career ==
Ardila conducted research in Comparative psychology, Experimental psychology, Psychobiology, Social psychology, Peace psychology, Psychology of learning, Psychology of science, History of psychology, and International psychology. He published 35 books and over 350 peer-reviewed articles.

He directed the Department of Psychology at the National University of Colombia (1970–1972), organized the Psychology program at the University of the Andes (Colombia) (1972), and founded the Clinical Psychology master’s program at Santo Tomás University (Colombia) (1976).

== Major works ==
=== Psychology of Learning ===
Published in 1970, Psicología del Aprendizaje (Psychology of Learning) became one of his most influential books, with 27 editions and reprints. It integrates behavioral, cognitive, and social perspectives on learning, emphasizing the interaction of biological, psychological, and social factors.

=== Walden Three ===
In 1979, Ardila published Walden Tres, a utopian novel inspired by B. F. Skinner’s Walden Two. The book imagines a scientific community in Latin America organized under behavioral principles to promote education, cooperation, and social equity.

=== Experimental Synthesis of Behavior ===
Ardila’s Experimental Synthesis of Behavior (1988) proposed an integrative paradigm for psychology, based on experimental analysis of behavior, empirical verification, and the concept of “behavioral humanism.”

=== Philosophy of Psychology ===
In 2002, together with Mario Bunge, he co-authored Filosofía de la psicología (Philosophy of Psychology), exploring the conceptual and methodological foundations of psychology as a science.

== Awards and honors ==
Ardila received numerous awards, including:

- Interamerican Psychology Award – Interamerican Society of Psychology (1983)
- Distinguished Contributions to the International Advancement of Psychology – American Psychological Association (2007)
- National Scientific Merit Award – Colombian Association for the Advancement of Science (2004)
- Distinguished Professional Contributions Award – International Association of Applied Psychology (2022)

He also received honorary doctorates from Ricardo Palma University (Peru, 2003), Inca Garcilaso de la Vega University (Peru, 2014), and National University of Rosario (Argentina, 2016).

== Legacy ==
The Foundation for the Advancement of Psychology in Colombia, in cooperation with the Interamerican Society of Psychology, established the Rubén Ardila Award to honor lifetime contributions to psychology. His scientific and literary work, especially Walden Tres and the Experimental Synthesis of Behavior, continues to influence Latin American psychology.

== See also ==
- Behaviorism
- Experimental analysis of behavior
