= Sewu Dino =

2023 Indonesian supernatural horror film

Sewu Dino A Thousand Days
- Film poster
- Directed by: Kimo Stamboel
- Screenplay by: Agasyah Karim; Khalid Khasogi
- Produced by: Manoj Punjabi
- Starring: Mikha Tambayong; Givina Lukita Dewi; Agla Artalidia; Gisellma Firmansyah; Marthino Lio; Pritt Timothy; Rio Dewanto; Karina Suwandi
- Cinematography: Patrick Tashadian
- Edited by: Arifin Cu'unk; Fachrun Daud
- Music by: Ricky Lionardi
- Production company: MD Pictures
- Distributed by: MD Entertainment
- Release date: April 19, 2023 (Indonesia)
- Running time: 121 minutes
- Country: Indonesia
- Languages: Indonesian; Javanese
- Budget: $1.2 million
- Box office: $10.9 million

Sewu Dino (lit. 'A thousand days') is a 2023 Indonesian horror film directed by Kimo Stamboel, based on Simpleman, a viral Twitter thread of the same name. The plot follows, Sri a young woman who accepts a generous job offer and is tasked to perform a cleansing ritual for Dela Atmojo, an unconscious girl who is suffering from the hex of 1000-days. The terror begins when her coworker neglects to finish the ritual. Failing to perform until the 1000th day will result in their demise.

== Plot ==
In the midst of economic difficulties, Sri (Mikha Tambayong) is accepted to work for the Atmojo family for a high fee, because she is unique: she was born on Friday Kliwon. Together with Erna (Givina Lukita Dewi) and Dini (Agla Artalidia), they are taken to a hidden hut in the middle of the forest. In the hut, Sri, Erna and Dini are tasked with washing Dela Atmojo (Gisellma Firmansyah), the granddaughter of Karsa Atmojo (Karina Suwandi), who is unconscious because of Sewu Dino's (A Thousand Days) witchcraft curse. They cannot run from the hut because they are bound by a mystical agreement with Karsa Atmojo, and they must complete the ritual until the 1000th day. If they break it, death awaits them.

== Cast ==
- Mikha Tambayong as Sri Rahayu
- Givina Lukita Dewi as Erna
- Agla Artalidia as Dini
- Gisellma Firmansyah as Della Atmodjo
- Marthino Lio as Sabdo Kuncoro
- Pritt Timothy as Mbah Tamin
- Rio Dewanto as Sugik
- Karina Suwandi as Karsa Atmodjo
- Maryam Supraba as Minah
- Ayez Kassar as Jatmiko
- Karina Ranau as Lydia
- Dayinta Melira as Sengarturih
- Delia Husein as Jum
- Rantya Affandy as Ratih

== Release ==
The film was officially announced to be released on April 20, 2023, to coincide with the 2023 Eid Al-Fitr holiday, but has been move up to April 19, 2023.

It was also released on Malaysia, Singapore, and Brunei on the same day.

== Reception ==
=== Box office ===
On the first day of it released Sewu Dino has gained 187,000 moviegoers, it is one of biggest opening day for local film. As of April 25, the film surpassed one million tickets sales, making it one of the fastest local films to reach one million admissions. And it surpassed 3 million viewers on two weeks.

== See also ==
- Indonesian horror
