= Buku Harian Seorang Istri =

2021 Indonesian television series

- Release poster
- Genre: Melodrama; Romance
- Screenplay by: Serena Luna
- Story by: Serena Luna
- Directed by: Maruli Ara
- Starring: Zoe Jackson; Cinta Brian; Antonio Blanco Jr.; Rangga Azof; Hana Saraswati
- Theme music composer: Agnez Mo; Sandy Canester
- Opening theme: "Coz I Love You" by Agnez Mo
- Ending theme: "Coz I Love You" by Agnez Mo
- Composer: Laurensius Steven
- Country of origin: Indonesia
- Original language: Indonesian
- No. of seasons: 1
- No. of episodes: 800

Production
- Producer: David S. Suwarto
- Cinematography: Bob Emilio Parera
- Editors: Danny A.W.; Alex Fernandes; Satria; Eko Hp.; Basofi; Rosario; Agus Sudono; Fredy Simonis; Bumi Kasumbo
- Camera setup: Multi-camera
- Running time: 120 minutes
- Production company: SinemArt

Original release
- Network: SCTV
- Release: 12 January 2021 – 4 September 2022

Buku Harian Seorang Istri is an Indonesian television series which premiered on 12 January 2021 on SCTV. The series is directed by Maruli Ara and stars Zoe Jackson, Cinta Brian, and Antonio Blanco Jr.

== Synopsis ==
Nana was forced to marry Dewa Buwana because of Wawan's request, her father. However, their marriage did not go smoothly as Nana had hoped. Dewa was forced to comply with Wawan's wishes because he did not want to be jailed for hitting Wawan. Nana's daily life as a married couple was tortured without any love between the two of them. Meanwhile, Dewa, who had loved Alya from the start and planned to marry her but was prevented from getting his mother's blessing, Farah ended up continuing her relationship with Alya.

== Cast ==
- Zoe Jackson as Nana Juniarto (Note: Sometimes referred to as Nana Buwana because of her marriage to Dewa Buwana.)
- Cinta Brian as Dewa Buwana
- Antonio Blanco Jr. as Adhi Buwana/Pasha (Note: Adhi disguised himself as Pasha when he became the Buwana family's bodyguard.)
- Rangga Azof as Fajar Juniarto
- Hana Saraswati as Alya Wijaya Kusuma
- Asha Assuncao as Livia Buwana
- Mahdy Reza as Roni
- Sarah Samantha as Nurani Senja
- Aqeela Calista as Amira
- Saskia Chadwick as Saskia
- Meriam Bellina as Merlin Buwana
- Ingrid Kansil as Saskia's mother
- Dian Nitami as Farah Buwana
- Kevin Kambey as Kevin Argantha
- Ika Purpitasari as Ika Argantha
- Tengku Ryan as Naufal Aksana
- Vira Yuniar as Saras
- Rita Hamzah as Suketi
- Emir Pahlevi as Toni
- Claresta Taufan as Dewi
- Nando Helmy as Lucky
- Djihan Ranti as Jihan
- Riska Bunga Fahira as Neta
- Fitria Salwa Anggraini as Junior/Alvin (Note: Alvin is the name given to Alya and Kevin when they were kidnapped.)
- Callista Arum as Lula Juniarto
- Haico Van der Veken as Cornelia
- Umar Lubis as Wawan Juniarto
- Adjie Pangestu as Rama Buwana
- Rina Hassim as Ratu Buwana
- Hanna Hasyim as Nawang
- Ine Dewi as Prasasty Sari/Nissa
- Firzanah Alya as Salsa
- Ananda Faturrahman as Diana
- Adipura as Arman Adhitama
- Ise Irish as Claudia Sabrina & Clara Sabrina
- Ochi Rosdiana as Friska
- Indah Indriana as Ani
- Elma Agustin as Putri
- Zack Lee as Zacky
- Yadi Timo as Marwan
- Henny Timbul as Inem
- Ahmad Fadil Joan as Fadly
- Nabila Zavira as Elma
- Argio Cetta Early as Gio
- Ahmad Jalaluddin Rumi as Reza
- Tyas Wahono as Benni
- Maura Gabrielle as Dina
- Joseph Hungan as George Hungan
- Vina Adam as Naura Hungan
- Tsania Marwa as Lady
- Ratu Zahra as Mia
- Siva Aprilia as Lita Aprilia
- Macho Virgonta as Rico
- Kayla Nur Syahwa as Fitri
- Ida Bagus Gde Aditya Restha Pratama as Hendry
- Hengky Tornando as Arief Wicaksono
- Luz Victoria as Mirna
- Marissa Zhifania Azzahira as Nanda
- Roy Marten as GM
- Eva Anindita as Eva
- Fendy Pradana as Alfonso
- Rassya Hidayah as Chiko
- Jajang C. Noer as Widya
- Feby Fristya as Anya
- Hessel Steven as Naufal's office assistant

Cameo

- Virgoun
- Melly Goeslaw
- Audy Item
- Anto Hoed
- Rey Bong

== Theme song ==
Title	Performed by	Written by	Label
"Coz I Love You"	Agnez Mo	Sandy Canester & Agnez Mo	Aquarius Musikindo
"Pelangi di Matamu"	Alma	Azis MS	Pelangi Records
"Percaya"	Natta Reza		Alfa Records
"Orang Yang Sama"	Virgoun Tambunan		Digital Rantai Maya
"Jagad Khayalku"	Rossa	Dwi Jayati	Trinity Optima Production
"Bahagia Bersamamu"	Haico Van der Veken	Dodhy	Bentuk Musik
"Jika"	Melly Goeslaw feat Ari Lasso	Melly Goeslaw	Aquarius Musikindo
"Bersamamu"	Melly Goeslaw	Ale Hoed	100% Production
"Sebuah Rasa"	Agnez Mo	Pay and Dewiq	Aquarius Musikindo
"Aku Ratumu"	Niniya	Dodhy	Le Moesiek Revole
"Arti Hadirmu"	Audy Item	Adam M. Subarkah	Sony Music Entertainment Indonesia

Main theme song

== Awards and nominations ==
Year	Award	Category	Recipient	Results	Ref.
2021	Infotainment Awards	Best Male Character (Dewa)	Cinta Brian	Nominated	
2021	Infotainment Awards	Best Female Character (Nana)	Zoe Jackson	Nominated	
2021	Infotainment Awards	Best Romantic Scene	Dewa and Nana's romantic dinner	Nominated	
2021	Indonesian Drama Series Awards	Favorite Drama Series Couples	Cinta Brian & Zoe Abbas Jackson	Nominated	
2021	Indonesian Drama Series Awards	Favorite Female Lead in a Drama Series	Zoe Jackson	Nominated	
2021	Indonesian Drama Series Awards	Favorite Child Actor in Drama Series	Firzanah Alya	Nominated	
2021	Indonesian Drama Series Awards	Favorite Drama Series Director	Maruli Ara	Nominated	
2021	Indonesian Television Awards	Most Popular Prime Time Drama Programs	Buku Harian Seorang Istri	Nominated	
2021	Indonesian Television Awards	Most Popular Actress	Zoe Jackson	Nominated	
2021	Festival Film Bandung	Distinguished Television Series Director	Maruli Ara	Nominated	
2021	SCTV Awards	The Most Popular Soap Opera	Buku Harian Seorang Istri	Nominated	
2021	SCTV Awards	The Most Popular Soap Opera Soundtracks	"Coz I Love You" by Agnez Mo	Nominated	
2021	SCTV Awards	Most Popular Lead Actor	Cinta Brian	Nominated	
2021	SCTV Awards	Most Popular Supporting Actor	Antonio Blanco Jr.	Nominated	
2021	SCTV Awards	Most Popular Lead Actress	Zoe Jackson	Nominated	
2021	SCTV Awards	Most Popular Supporting Actress	Hana Saraswati	Nominated	
2022	Indonesian Drama Series Awards	Favorite Male Lead Actor in a Drama Series	Cinta Brian	Nominated	
2022	Indonesian Drama Series Awards	Favorite Supporting Actress in a Drama Series	Dian Nitami	Nominated	
2022	Indonesian Drama Series Awards	Antagonist in Favorite Drama Series	Hana Saraswati	Nominated	
2022	Indonesian Drama Series Awards	Favorite Child Actor in Drama Series	Firzanah Alya	Nominated	
2022	Indonesian Drama Series Awards	Favorite Couples in Drama Series	Zoe Jackson & Cinta Brian	Nominated	
2022	Indonesian Drama Series Awards	Director of Favorite Drama Series	Maruli Ara	Nominated	
2022	Indonesian Television Awards	Most Popular Primetime Drama Programs	Buku Harian Seorang Istri	Nominated	
2022	Indonesian Television Awards	Most Popular Soap Opera Actors	Cinta Brian	Nominated	
2022	SCTV Awards	The Most Popular Soap Opera	Buku Harian Seorang Istri	Nominated	
2022	SCTV Awards	The Most Popular Soap Opera Soundtracks	"Coz I Love You" by Agnez Mo	Nominated	
2022	SCTV Awards	Most Popular Lead Actor	Cinta Brian	Won	
2022	SCTV Awards	Most Popular Supporting Actor	Antonio Blanco Jr.	Nominated	
2022	SCTV Awards	Most Popular Supporting Actor	Rangga Azof	Won	
2022	SCTV Awards	Most Popular Lead Actress	Zoe Jackson	Nominated	
2022	SCTV Awards	Most Popular Supporting Actress	Aqeela Calista	Nominated	

== Controversy ==
=== IBC give first warning ===
Indonesian Broadcasting Commission (IBC) imposed an administrative sanction of written warning on 30 January 2021 because it was a scene of a man and a woman on a bed in a position overlapping each other and eye contact.

=== IBC give a second warning ===
Indonesian Broadcasting Commission (IBC) imposed an administrative sanction of written warning on 10 March 2021 because there is an inner monologue of a woman who is deemed unfit to be broadcast related to sexual relations outside marriage.

== Online distribution ==
The series was also distributed on vidio.com a few hours after the broadcast.
