= Zoe Abbas Jackson =

Indonesian actress (born 2002)

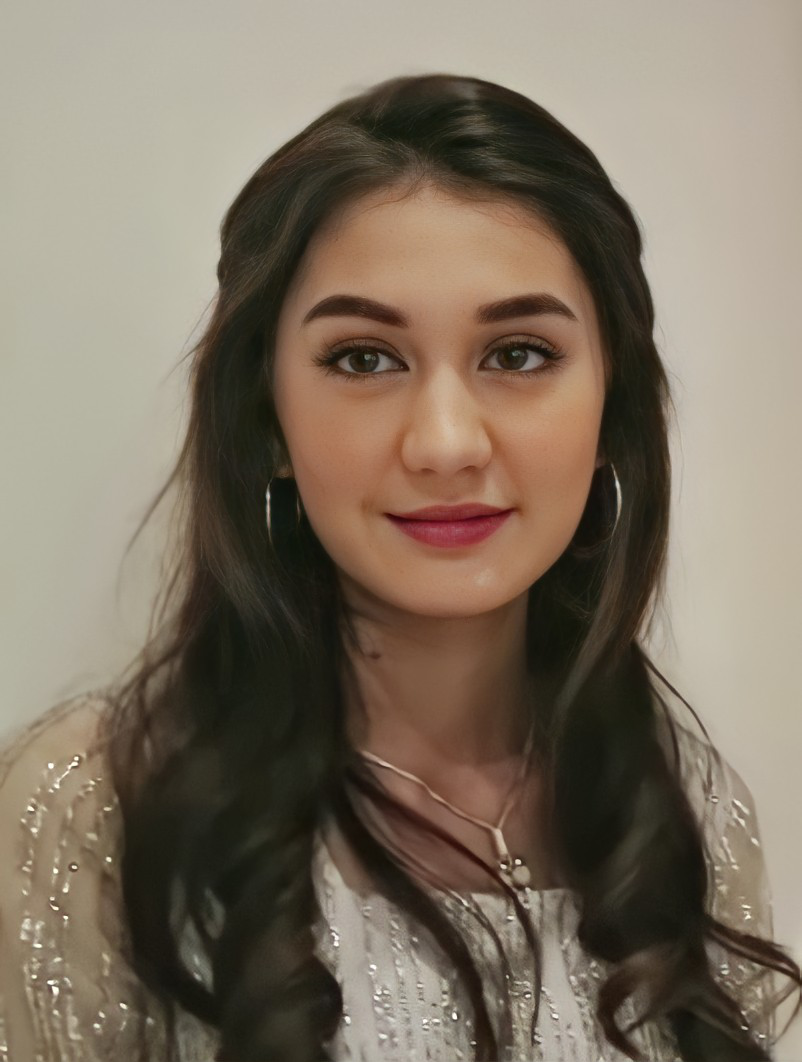
- Jackson in 2019
- Born: December 31, 2002 (age 23); Jakarta, Indonesia
- Occupations: Celebrity, Model

Zoe Abbas Jackson (born 31 December 2002) is an Indonesian actress, and model who is most known for being the main character on Buku Harian Seorang Istri.

== Career ==
She began doing advertisements at the age of 13, and started trying out for acting roles at the age of 14, even though she was not interested in acting. She did not attend acting school, though did eventually get an acting coach and trained on the set.

She debuted on the television series, I Love Jinny in 2016. She was in the 2017 horror film, Jailangkung. She made appearances in the television films, Kisah Nyata and Pintu Berkah in 2017 and 2018. and got a main role in the soap opera, "Kisa Cinta Anak Tiri". She joined the Anak Langit and Cinta Karena Cinta soap operas in 2019 and starred in the movie, MeloDyla. In 2020, she starred in the soap opera, Cinta tapi Benci. She got her biggest role in 2021, when she became the main character of Buku Harian Seorang Istri. She starred in the 2022 film, Nariti, Romansa Danau Toba. In October 2022, she was chosen to portray the singer, Nike Ardilla, in the upcoming, Nike Ardilla the Series web series.

She has also appeared in music videos for Indonesian artists, Firman Siagin and Aditya Zoni and models.

== Personal life ==
She is of English and Indonesian descent. She is the daughter of Charles Gretham Jackson and is the second of three siblings. Her sister, Laura Abbas Jackson, is also an actress. Due to her looks, she is often compared to an artist named Irish Bella and is often nicknamed, "Irish Bella".
