= José Ardila =

Colombian writer

José Ardila (1985) is a Colombian writer. He was born in Chigorodó and now lives in Medellín.

He has published two short story collections to date: Divagaciones en el interior de una ballena and Libro del tedio. He is also a screenwriter; among his credits are the award-winning short films La heredad and Los enemigos, as well as the feature film La cabalá de pez. He is currently working on a novel.

He contributes regularly to magazines and newspapers such as El Malpensante and El País.

In 2021, he was named by Granta magazine as one of the best young writers in Hispanic literature.
