= Alfredo Ardila =

Colombian neuropsychologist

Alfredo Ardila (September 4, 1946 - January 9, 2021) was a Colombian neuropsychologist. He graduated as a psychologist from the National University of Colombia and received a doctoral degree in neuropsychology from the Moscow State University where he worked with Alexander R. Luria. He published in cognitive and behavioral neurosciences, especially in neuropsychology. His research interests included brain organization of cognition, the historical origin of human cognition, aphasia, and bilingualism.

Ardila was President of the Latin American Association of Neuropsychology (ALAN), Latin American Society of Neuropsychology, Hispanic Neuropsychological Society, and member of the Board of Governors of the International Neuropsychological Society.

He received several academic awards, including the National Prize of Psychology (Colombia, 1980), Alejandro Angel Escobar Award Category Science (Colombia, 1997), Prize CNC in Latin American Neuroscience] (Spain, 2012)ref, and Honor Vygotsky Prize (Portugal, 2016).

He was a full Professor at the Department of Communication Sciences and Disorders , Florida International University (Miami). He was also Professor of Psychology at Albizu University in Miami, Florida, Honorary Professor at the School of Medicine, University of Chile, Honorary Member of the School of Medicine, University of Antioquia, and visiting professor at the Department of Psychology of the Moscow State University. Following his retirement from FIU, Ardila held academic positions at the Institute of Linguistics and Cross-Cultural Communication or the I.M. Sechenov First Moscow State Medical University, in Moscow, Russia, and in Albizu University, Miami. Ardila died on January 9, 2021. Ardila should be considered as the father of Latin American neuropsychology and one of the most prominent neuropsychologists in its history.

== Books ==
- Ardila, A. (1979). Psicofisiologia de los Procesos Complejos [Psychophysiology of the Complex Processes] Me'xico: Editorial Trillas.
- Ardila, A. & Moreno, C. (1979). Aspectos Biologicos de la Memoria y el Aprendizaje [Biological Aspects of Memory and Learning]. Mexico: Editorial Trillas.
- Ardila, A. (ed) (1980). Psicología de la Percepción [Psychology of Perception]. Me'xico: Editorial Trillas.
- Ardila, A. (1983). Psicobiología del Lenguaje [Psychobiology of Language]. Me'xico: Editorial Trillas.
- Ardila, A. (1984). Neurolingüística: Mecanismos cerebrales de la actividad verbal [Neurolinguistics: Brain mechanisms of verbal activity]. Mexico: Editorial Trillas.
- Ardila, A., & Ostrosky, F. (eds) (1984). The Right Hemisphere: Neurology and Neuropsychology. London: Gordon and Breach Science Publishers.
- Ardila, A., & Rosselli, M. (1986). La Vejez: Neuropsicología del Fenómeno del Envejecimiento [Old Age: Neuropsychology of Aging]. Medelli'n: Prensa Creativa.
- Ostrosky, F., & Ardila, A. (1986). Hemisferio Derecho y Conducta [Right Hemisphere and Behavior]. Mexico: Editorial Trillas.
- Ardila, A., & Ostrosky, F. (eds) (1988). Lenguaje Oral y Escrito [Oral and Written Language]. México: Editorial Trillas.
- Ardila, A., & Ostrosky, F. (eds) (1989). Brain Organization of Language and Cognitive Processes. New York: Plenum Press.
- Ardila, A., & Ostrosky, F. (1991). El Diagnóstico del Daño Cerebral: Un Enfoque Neuropsicológico [Diagnosis of Brain Damage: A neuropsychological Perspective]. Mexico: Editorial Trillas.
- Ardila, A., Rosselli, M., & Puente, A. (1994). Neuropsychological evaluation of the Spanish speaker. New York: Plenum Press.
- Ostrosky Solis, F., & Ardila, A. (1994). Cerebro y lenguaje: Perspectivas en la organizacion cerebral del lenguaje y de los procesos cognoscitivos [Brain and Language: Perspectives in the Study of the Brain Organization of Language and Cognitive Processes]. Mexico: Editorial Trillas.
- Benson, D.F. & Ardila, A. (1996). Aphasia: A Clinical Perspective. New York: Oxford University Press.
- Ostrosky, F., Ardila, A., & Dochy, R. (1996). Rehabilitación neuropsicológica [Neuropsychological Rehabilitation]. Me'xico: Ariel Planeta.
- Rosselli, M., Ardila, A., Pineda, D. & Lopera, F. (1997). Neuropsicologia Infantil. [Child neuropsychology]. Medellin: Editoria Prensa Creativa.
- Arango, J.C., Fernández Guinea, S., & Ardila, A. (Eds). (2003). Las demencias: aspectos clínicos, neuropsicológicos y tratamiento. Mexico: Editorial Manual Moderno
- Ardila, A., Rosselli, M., & Matute, E. (2005). Neuropsicología de los trastornos del aprendizaje [Neuropsychology of learning disorders]. Mexico: Manual Moderno, Universidad de Guadalajara-UNAM
- Ardila, A. (2005). Las afasias [Tha aphasias]. Guadalajara: University of Guadalajara (Mexico)
- Perea, M.V., & Ardila, A. (2005). Sindromes neuropsicologicos [Neuropsychological Syndromes] Salamanca: Ediciones Amarú
- Uzzell, B., Pontón, M. & Ardila A. (Eds). (2007). International Handbook of Cross-Cultural Neuropsychology. Mahwah, NJ: Lawrence Erlbaum Associates.
- Ardila, A. & Ramos, E. (eds). (2007). Speech and language disorders in bilinguals. New York: Nova Science Publishers.
- Ardila, A. & Rosselli, M. (2007) Neuropsicologia Clinica. Mexico, D.F.: Editorial Manual Moderno.
- Rosselli, M., Matute, E. & Ardila, A. (2010)_Neuropsicologia del Desarrollo Infantil. Mexico: Manual Moderno
- Tirapu Ustárroz, J., García-Molina, A., Ríos Lago, M. & Ardila, A. (2012). Neuropsicología de la corteza prefrontal y las funciones ejecutivas. Barcelona: Editorial Viguera.
- Ardila, A. & Ostrosky-Solis, F. (2012). Guia para el Diagnóstico Neuropsicológico.
- Ardila, A. (2014) Aphasia Handbook . Miami, FL: Florida International University
- Ardila, A., Arocho-Llantín, J.L., Labos, E. & Rodriguez- Irizarry, W. (2015). Diccionario de Neuropsicologia.
- Ardila, A. Historical Development of Human Cognition. A Cultural-Historical Neuropsychological Perspective, Dordrecht: Springer, 2018.
