= Nike Ardilla =

Indonesian singer and actress (1975–1995)

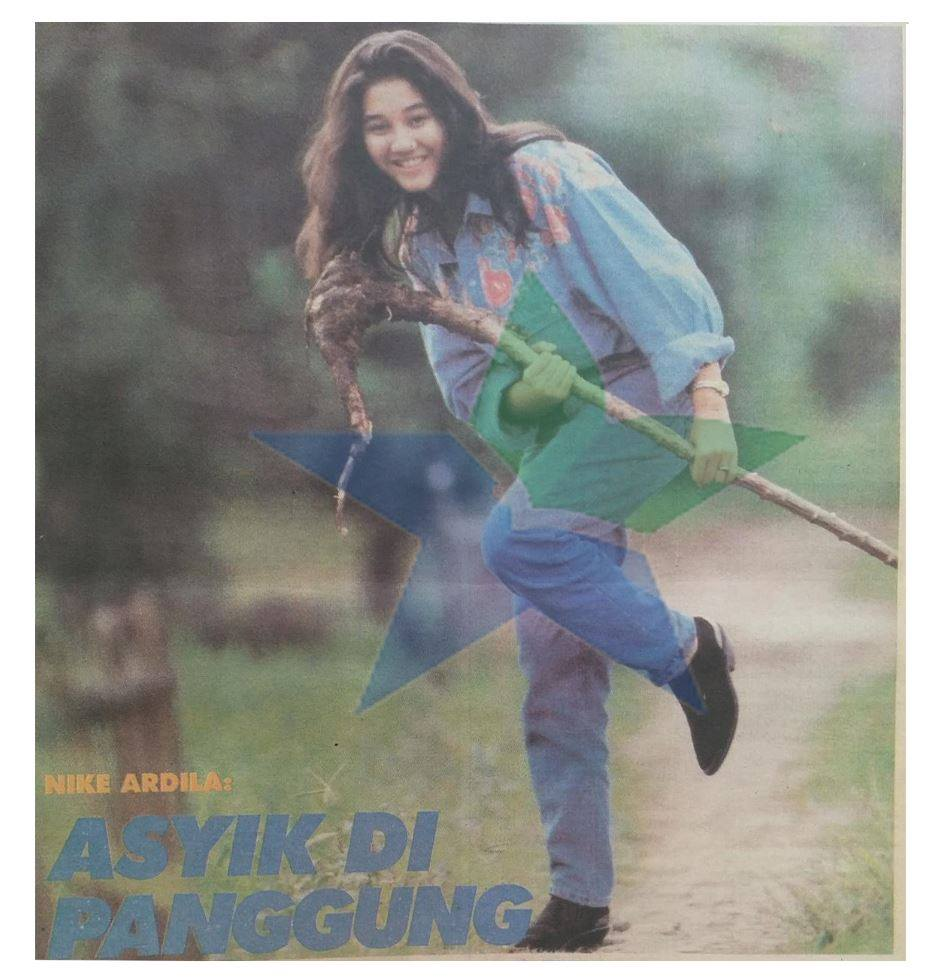
- Nike Ardilla in 1990
- Born: 27 December 1975; Bandung, West Java, Indonesia
- Died: 19 March 1995 (aged 19); Bandung, West Java, Indonesia
- Cause of death: Traffic collision
- Other name: Nike Astrina
- Occupations: Singer; actress; model
- Years active: 1987–1995
- Musical career
- Genres: Slow rock; pop rock; rock ballads
- Instrument: Vocals
- Labels: Ariesta; JK; Blackboard Indonesia; Musica

Nike Ardilla (Note: Later Indonesian sources give her full name as Raden Rara Nike Ratnadilla Kusnadi. One source spells the surname "Ratnadila", with one l. Another gives the shorter form Nike Ratnadilla.) (27 December 1975 – 19 March 1995) was an Indonesian singer, actress, and model. She also acted in films and television dramas and worked as a fashion and photographic model.

Nike began performing and entering singing competitions as a child. After recording under the stage name Nike Astrina, she adopted the name Nike Ardilla and released Seberkas Sinar in 1989. Her next album, Bintang Kehidupan (1990), sold around two million copies and received the BASF Award for best-selling rock album. In 1991, she won the new-singer competition at the Asian Song Festival in Shanghai. She continued to release commercially successful albums until 1995, while appearing in films including Kasmaran, Gadis Foto Model, and Ricky Nakalnya Anak Muda.

Nike died at the age of 19 in a traffic collision in Bandung on 19 March 1995. Her albums were later reissued on vinyl.

== Early life and training ==
Nike Ardilla was born in Bandung, West Java, on 27 December 1975, the youngest of three children of R. Eddy Kusnadi and Nining Ningsihrat. Her father worked in the training division of the state railway company.

She began winning singing competitions while at primary school, including a national singing competition held by the state broadcaster TVRI when she was ten. At the Himpunan Artis Penyanyi dan Musisi Indonesia (HAPMI; Indonesian Association of Singers and Musicians), Ajie Esa Poetra trained her in expressive delivery, while Deni Kantong taught vocal technique. At a singing event in Bandung, she met talent manager Denny Sabri, who gave her the stage name Nike Astrina and began presenting her as a rock singer.

== Career ==
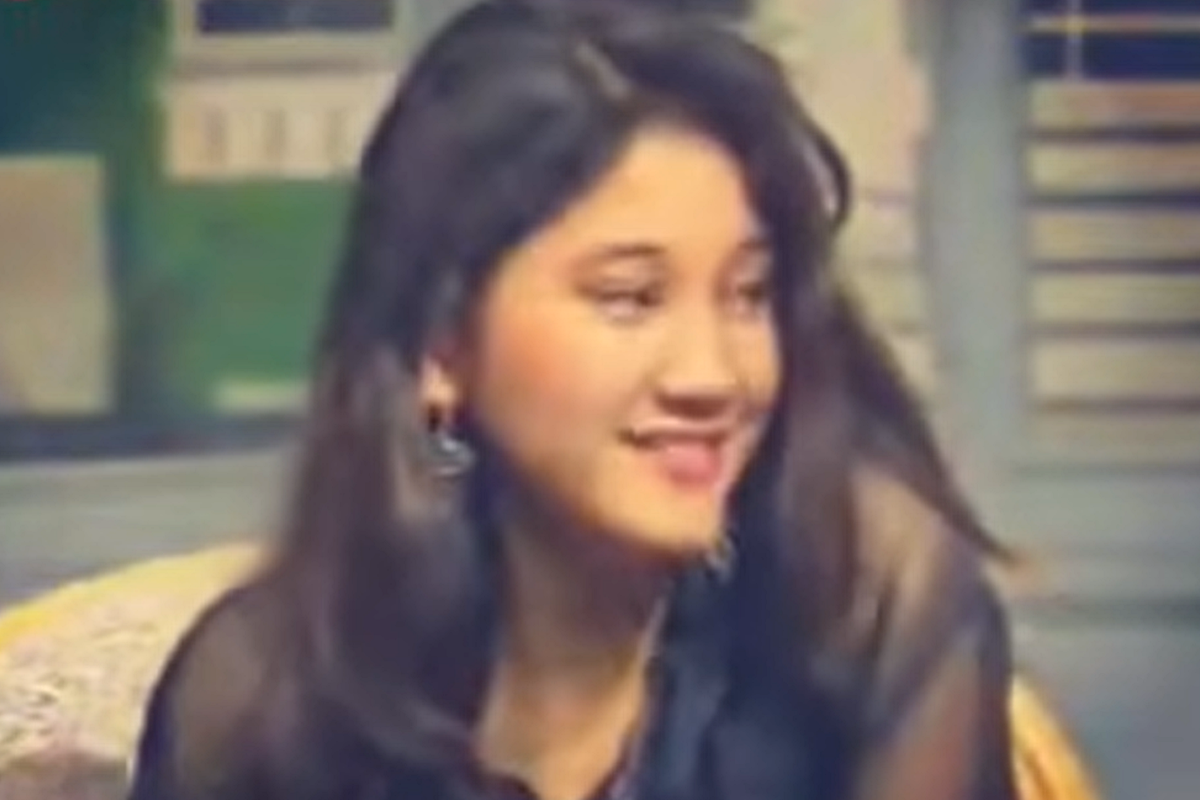
Nike Ardilla in Malaysia, 1991

=== Early recordings and breakthrough ===
Using the stage name Nike Astrina, Nike made her first released recording with "Lupa Diri", which appeared on the 1987 compilation album Bandung Rock Power. In 1988, she recorded the album Hanya Satu Nama for JK Records, but its release was cancelled because she was considered too young; it was eventually issued in 2013.

At 14, Nike began working with songwriter and producer Deddy Dores, who became her mentor and wrote many of her best-known songs. After changing her stage name to Nike Ardilla, she released Seberkas Sinar through Ariesta Records in 1989; it reportedly sold about 500,000 copies.

=== Commercial success ===
Bintang Kehidupan followed in 1990 and sold around two million copies. In 2020, Musica Studios gave a higher figure of more than six million copies sold in Indonesia and elsewhere in Southeast Asia. The album received the 1990 BASF Award for best-selling rock album, and in 1991 Nike won the New Singers Contest at the Asian Song Festival in Shanghai with "Star of Life", an English-language version of Bintang Kehidupan.

Her succeeding albums included Nyalakan Api, Matahariku, Biarlah Aku Mengalah, Biarkan Cintamu Berlalu, and Sandiwara Cinta. In Malaysia, Biarkan Cintamu Berlalu was issued in 1994 under the title Duri Terlindung and reportedly sold about 1.25 million copies. Sandiwara Cinta, released in 1995, was also reported to have sold about two million copies. By 1995, she had recorded eleven commercially successful albums, six of them produced by Dores. Musica Studios has credited Nike with worldwide album sales of more than 30 million and described her as the best-selling Indonesian recording artist in history.

=== Acting and modelling ===
Nike appeared in the film Kasmaran (1987), alongside Ida Iasha and Slamet Rahardjo. Still using the stage name Nike Astrina, she appeared in Gadis Foto Model in 1989. The following year, she played the lead opposite Ryan Hidayat in Ricky Nakalnya Anak Muda. Her other screen work included films in the Si Kabayan series and the television drama None. Quinn also lists Sukreni Gadis Bali, Saputangan dari Bandung Selatan, and Warisan I and Warisan II among her screen credits. Nike also appeared in fashion shows and worked as a photographic model. In 1990, she received the Favorite award in the Gadis Sampul magazine cover-model competition.

== Musical style and public image ==
Nike recorded slow rock, pop rock, and rock ballads, many of them written and produced by Deddy Dores and Youngky RM.. Australian academic George Quinn described her voice as powerful and expressive but also vulnerable, and her singing as innocent and exuberant. He wrote that her audience included many parents as well as urban teenagers and young adults.

Her lyrics dealt mainly with love, betrayal, separation, faith, and resilience, without explicit references to sex, drugs, crime, poverty, or politics. Quinn linked the songs' emphasis on parental obedience, tradition, fate, and self-sacrifice to the "familyism" promoted during Indonesia's New Order period.

Nike was promoted as a "lady rocker", a label then used to distinguish female rock singers from performers associated with pop cengeng, or sentimental pop. Commercial television, FM radio, and entertainment magazines expanded during her rise and gave extensive coverage to her music and personal life. Her father helped manage her career and handled relations with the media.

== Death, posthumous reception, and legacy ==
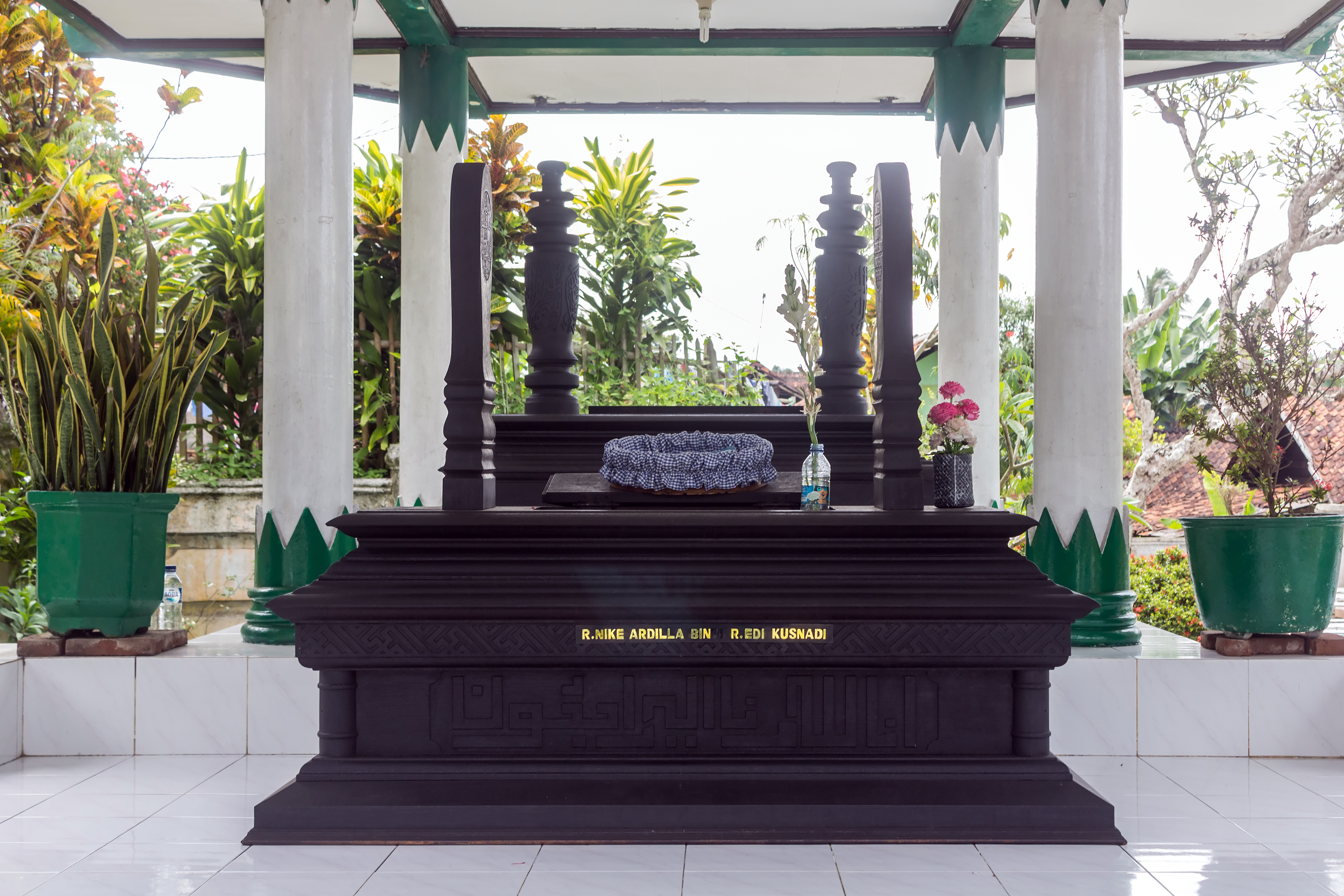
Nike's grave in Ciamis, West Java

Early on 19 March 1995, Nike left Bandung for Bogor, where she was due to resume filming a television drama, with Atun Sofiatun travelling beside her. While driving on Raden Eddy Martadinata Street, she lost control of the car and struck a tree and a concrete structure. Nike died, while Atun survived and temporarily experienced memory loss. The cause of the crash was not definitively established. Quinn considered fatigue a likely explanation, noting that Nike had not slept the previous night. Nike was taken later that day to her family's home village of Imbanegara, near Ciamis in West Java, and buried there.

News of her death prompted nationwide mourning; over the following days, tens of thousands of people left messages of condolence at her Bandung home, while floral tributes remained at the crash site for months. Two months later, a commemorative concert in Bandung featuring 15 singers and several bands raised money for the newly established Nike Ardilla Foundation. On the first anniversary of her death, the Indonesian postal service Pos Indonesia issued 50,000 commemorative postcards and 20,000 envelopes, which sold out within days, while sales of her recordings increased.

A mausoleum was completed at her burial site in Imbanegara in 1998. Quinn reported that hundreds of visitors came to the grave on the anniversaries of Nike's birth and death, with fan clubs and community groups arranging trips by chartered bus. The visits continued during Islamic holidays; in 2019, the gravekeepers said that the site regularly became busy before Ramadan and during the week after Eid al-Fitr. Nike's family also established the Nike Ardilla Museum in Bandung, which became a destination for visiting fans.

Quinn called her an "instant pop saint". He argued that the mausoleum and stories of her piety, premonitions, and miracles presented her as a saint within popular Indonesian Islam. Her albums continued to be reissued on vinyl. Bintang Kehidupan was released in that format in December 2020, followed by Sandiwara Cinta in December 2021.

== Philanthropy ==
In 1993, Nike established a charitable foundation and financed the construction of a special school in Bandung for deaf children and children with intellectual disabilities. The school remained in operation after her death, supported by income from continuing sales of her recordings.

== Works and accolades ==
=== Selected albums ===
- Hanya Satu Nama (recorded in 1988; released in 2013)
- Seberkas Sinar (1989)
- Bintang Kehidupan (1990)
- Nyalakan Api (1991)
- Matahariku (1991)
- Biarlah Aku Mengalah (1992)
- Biarkan Cintamu Berlalu (1994)
- Duri Terlindung (1994)
- Sandiwara Cinta (1995)
- Mama Aku Ingin Pulang (1995)
- Suara Hatiku (1996)

=== Selected filmography ===
- Kasmaran (1987)
- Gadis Foto Model (1989)
- Ricky Nakalnya Anak Muda (1990)
- films in the Si Kabayan series
- Sukreni Gadis Bali (1993)
- Saputangan dari Bandung Selatan (1994)
- Warisan I and Warisan II (1995)
- None (television drama)

=== Awards and honours ===
- 1985: First honourable mention, TVRI's Lagu Pilihanku competition
- 1985: Winner, Bandung HAPMI Pop Singer Festival
- 1990: Favourite entrant, Gadis Sampul magazine cover-model competition
- 1990: BASF Award for best-selling rock album, Bintang Kehidupan
- 1991: BASF Awards For Best Selling Pop Rock Album, Nyalakan Api
- 1991: Winner of the new-singer competition at the Asian Song Festival in Shanghai, for "Star of Life"
- 1993: BASF Awards Kategori Penjualan Kaset Terlaris Album, Biarlah Aku Mengalah
- 1994: HDX Awards Kategori Pop Rock Album Terbaik, Biarkan Cintamu Berlalu
- 1994: Pemenang Video Musik Terbaik Indonesia, Biarkan Cintamu Berlalu
- 1995: HDX Awards Kategori Kaset Emas Abum, Sandiwara Cinta
- 1995: HDX Awards For Best Platinum Album, Mama Aku Ingin Pulang
